= Roper steam velocipede =

Steam-powered velocipede

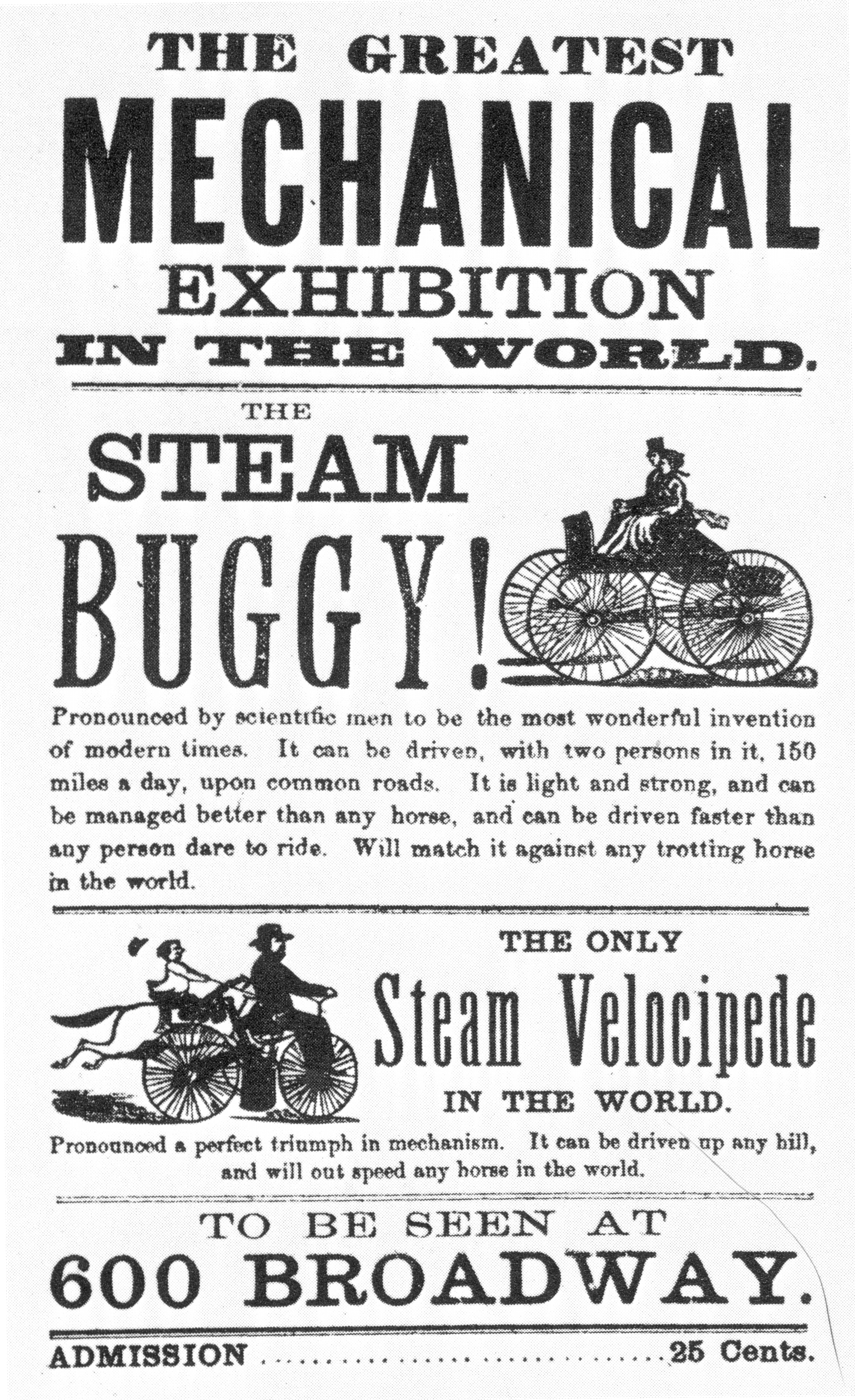
- Handbill for Roper steam demonstration.
- Manufacturer: Sylvester H. Roper
- Production: 1867–1869, 1884–1896
- Assembly: Boston, Massachusetts
- Class: Steam motorcycle

The Roper steam velocipede was a steam-powered velocipede built by inventor Sylvester H. Roper of Roxbury, Boston, Massachusetts, United States sometime from 1867 to 1869. It is one of three machines which have been called the first motorcycle, along with the Michaux-Perreaux steam velocipede, also dated 1867–1869, and the 1885 Daimler Reitwagen. Historians disagree over whether the Roper or the Michaux-Perreaux came first. Though the Reitwagen came many years later than the two steam cycles, it is often labeled as the "first motorcycle" because there is doubt by some experts whether a steam cycle should meet the definition of a motorcycle.

After his initial prototype of the late 1860s, Roper built a new and revised version in 1894, based on the then state of the art safety bicycle frame type. Sylvester Roper died of an apparent heart attack while riding this machine in 1896.

An 1869 Roper machine is now in the Smithsonian Institution, and one from 1894 is in private hands after being offered at auction in 2012. An 1894 Roper velocipede was exhibited in the Guggenheim Museum's The Art of the Motorcycle show at their Las Vegas venue, and was shown in 2011 at the Deeley Museum collection in Vancouver.

== Allegations about a first motorcycle ==
There are competing claims for the title of first motorcycle, depending on whether a steam motorcycle, or only one with an internal combustion engine, counts as a true motorcycle, and the uncertainty as to which of the two earliest steam motorcycles, the Roper or the Michaux-Perreaux, was built first.

=== Date ===
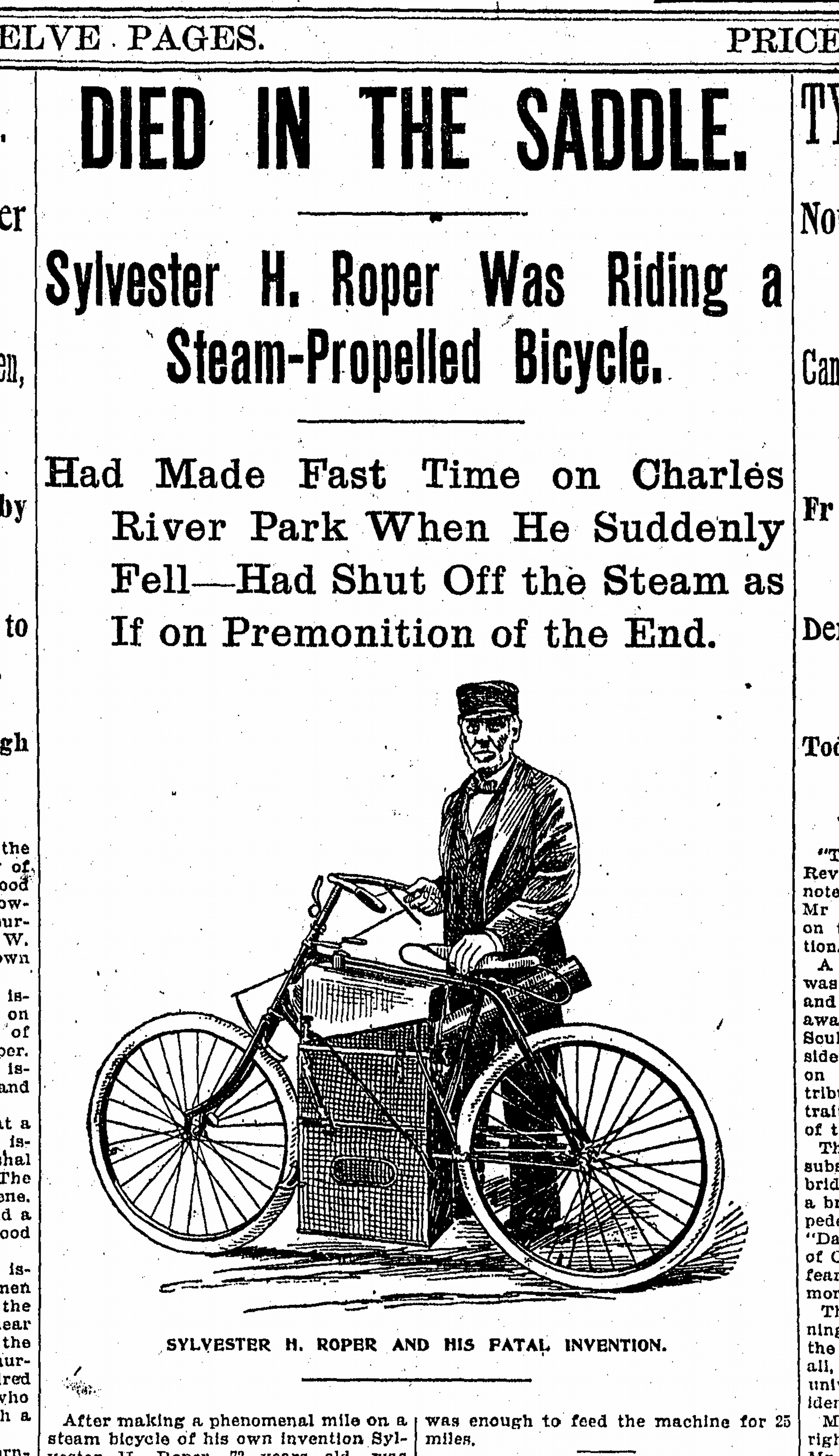
1896 Boston Daily Globe obituary.

The earliest date claimed for the existence of the Roper steam velocipede is 1867, but some say the Michaux-Perreaux also could have been made in 1867. Motorcycling historians Charles M. Falco and David Burgess-Wise, and Motorcycle Consumer News design columnist Glynn Kerr date the Roper later, to 1868, and the Owls Head museum's example is of that year. The AMA Hall of Fame and motoring author Mick Walker put Roper's steam velocipede at 1869, in accordance with the date of the machine in the Smithsonian. Cycle World's Alan Girdler dates both at 1868, while Mick Walker also declares a tie, but in the year 1869. Classic Bike editor Hugo Wilson says the existence of an 1869 patent for the Michaux-Perreaux gives it "the better claim to 'first'", even though the Roper was built around the same time. Though Sylvester Roper took out a number of patents for firearms, industrial machinery and other inventions, he did not obtain patents for any of his steam cycles or cars.

=== Definition of a motorcycle ===
If the definition of a motorcycle requires an internal combustion engine, as asserted by the Oxford English Dictionary and others, then the two pre-1870 steam cycles are disqualified and the first motorcycle may be Bernardi's 1882 motorized tricycle, or the Reitwagen of Wilhelm Maybach and Gottlieb Daimler, patented in 1885. Encyclopædia Britannica defines a motorcycle as, "any two-wheeled or, less commonly, three-wheeled motor vehicle, usually propelled by an internal-combustion engine."

A somewhat different argument acknowledges that while the several steam two- and three-wheelers that preceded the Reitwagen might have been technically motorcycles, none are candidates for the historical milestone of "the first motorcycle" because the technology they used was a dead end. Instead, the recognition should go to the internal combustion Reitwagen because it blazed a trail that was followed by the thousands of successful motorcycles subsequently built in the 20th century. As Cycle World's Technical Editor Kevin Cameron noted, "History follows things that succeed, not things that fail." By this logic, when some future form of motorcycle propulsion takes over from internal combustion, everything that went before will be disqualified, because it turned out to be a dead end technology. The ideology of elevating ideas current in the present and dismissing the past is sometimes called presentism.

Allan Girdler and Glynn Kerr nonetheless still favor the Roper, even by Cameron's criterion. The reason, they say, is that it did in fact pioneer successful motorcycle technologies, including the twistgrip throttle control, and the frame geometry and engine placement used by the motorcycle as we know it today, while the Reitwagen was exceedingly crude, failing to employ the well understood principles of rake and trail to remain upright by movements of the front fork, and turn by leaning. Rake and trail are created by having the steering axis angled to varying degrees, rather than perfectly vertical, and by having the steering axis slightly offset, creating trail. This subtle engineering makes it possible for the rider to turn the bicycle or motorcycle by the counterintuitive, and typically unconscious, technique of countersteering, in which the handlebar is turned slightly to the left, causing the machine to lean to the right, and turning the vehicle to the right. Trail, also called fork offset, is an element contributing to the stability of bicycle and motorcycle dynamics, and the lack of it was one reason why the Reitwagen had to rely on two outrigger wheels to keep it from falling down, so it remained vertical and was steered much like a tricycle. David Burgess-Wise called the Daimler-Maybach test bed "a crude makeshift", saying, "as a bicycle, it was 20 years out of date."

== 1867–1869 version ==
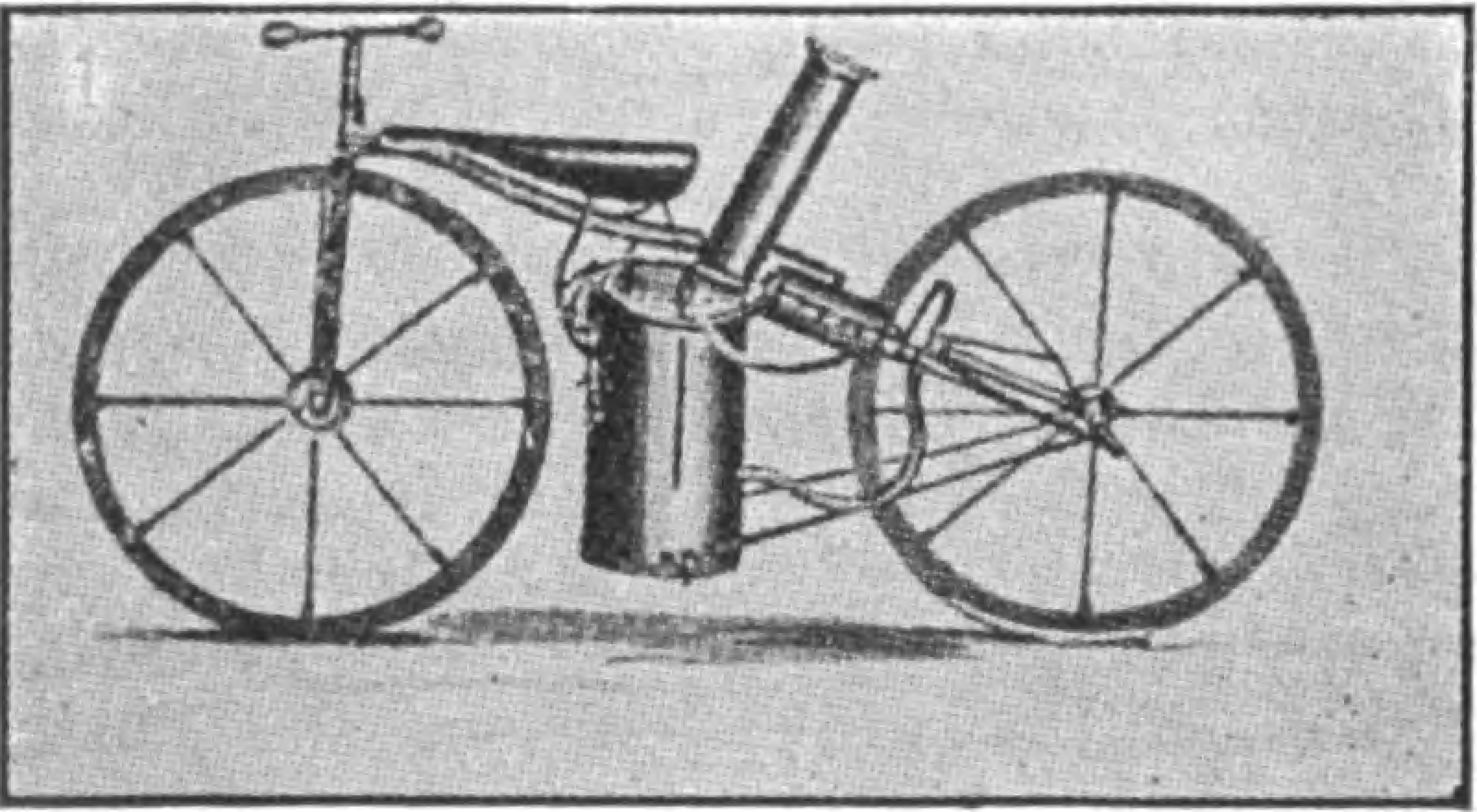
- Production: 1867–1869
- Engine: Twin cylinder steam
- Bore / stroke: 2 1/4 in (57 mm)/?
- Frame type: Iron
- Suspension: Forged iron fork, rigid
- Brakes: Spoon
- Tires: 34 in (860 mm) Iron on wood rims, wood spokes
- Wheelbase: 49 in (1,200 mm)

According to the Smithsonian, Roper's first velocipede of 1867–1869 used a purpose-built frame rather than adapting an existing velocipede frame by retrofitting a steam engine, but one contemporary newspaper account does assert that Roper repurposed a velocipede frame, and Setright and motoring author Roland Brown say Roper used a hickory wood frame built by the Hanlon Brothers, who made and demonstrated boneshakers at fairs and circuses, although the Smithsonian's Roper has an iron frame. It had a wheelbase of 49 in (1,200 mm) and two 34 in (860 mm) diameter wheels made of iron bands on wooden felloes with wooden spokes. It had a rigid, forged iron fork, and a solid handlebar with wooden grips. Unlike the modern twistgrip, where the grip on only one side is a sleeve that rotates around the handlebar to open the throttle, the Roper velocipede's entire bar was rotated with both hands, and it had a dual function. When turned forward, the throttle opened, and when turned backwards it applied the spoon brake on the front wheel. The seat doubled as the water reservoir; or the water tank can be described as saddle shaped. A hand pump transferred water from this tank to the boiler. The boiler was between the wheels with a "nautical looking" chimney from the boiler angling backwards behind the rider, with the firebox in the lower half of this housing, all of which hung from the frame with a spring to absorb shock, while two stay rods attached the bottom of the housing to the back of the frame. There were three water level cocks on the left side, near the water pump, and a drain valve on the bottom. The two cylinders, with bores of about 2 1/4 in (57 mm) were located on either side of the frame, from the upper part of the boiler near the chimney, connecting to 2 1/2 in (64 mm) cranks on the rear wheel. Exhaust steam, conveyed by tubing to the base of the chimney, provided a forced draft.

The original 1868 version of the velocipede is attributed to W.W. Austin of Winthrop, Massachusetts by some early newspaper accounts, which were taken up in later histories. Motoring author L. J. K. Setright believes Austin was only the rider or demonstrator of a Roper machine, and had been misidentified as its inventor. Austin is also mentioned as the owner, in 1901, of both the 1867–1869 Roper velocipede and an older four wheeled Roper steam car. The Smithsonian says a "Professor" W.W. Austin had exhibited a Roper steamer of unknown date, leading to the erroneous attribution to Austin instead of Roper. A Roper velocipede was on display at the first New York Auto Show in Madison Square Garden in November 1900, and again Austin was sometimes described as the inventor.

The 1867–1869 Roper velocipede, or one like it, was later given to the Smithsonian by John H. Bacon, and is currently in the America on the Move exhibit in the National Museum of American History, Washington, D.C. It is the oldest self-propelled road vehicle in the Smithsonian, and the second oldest in America, after the Dudgeon steamer.

== 1884–1896 version ==
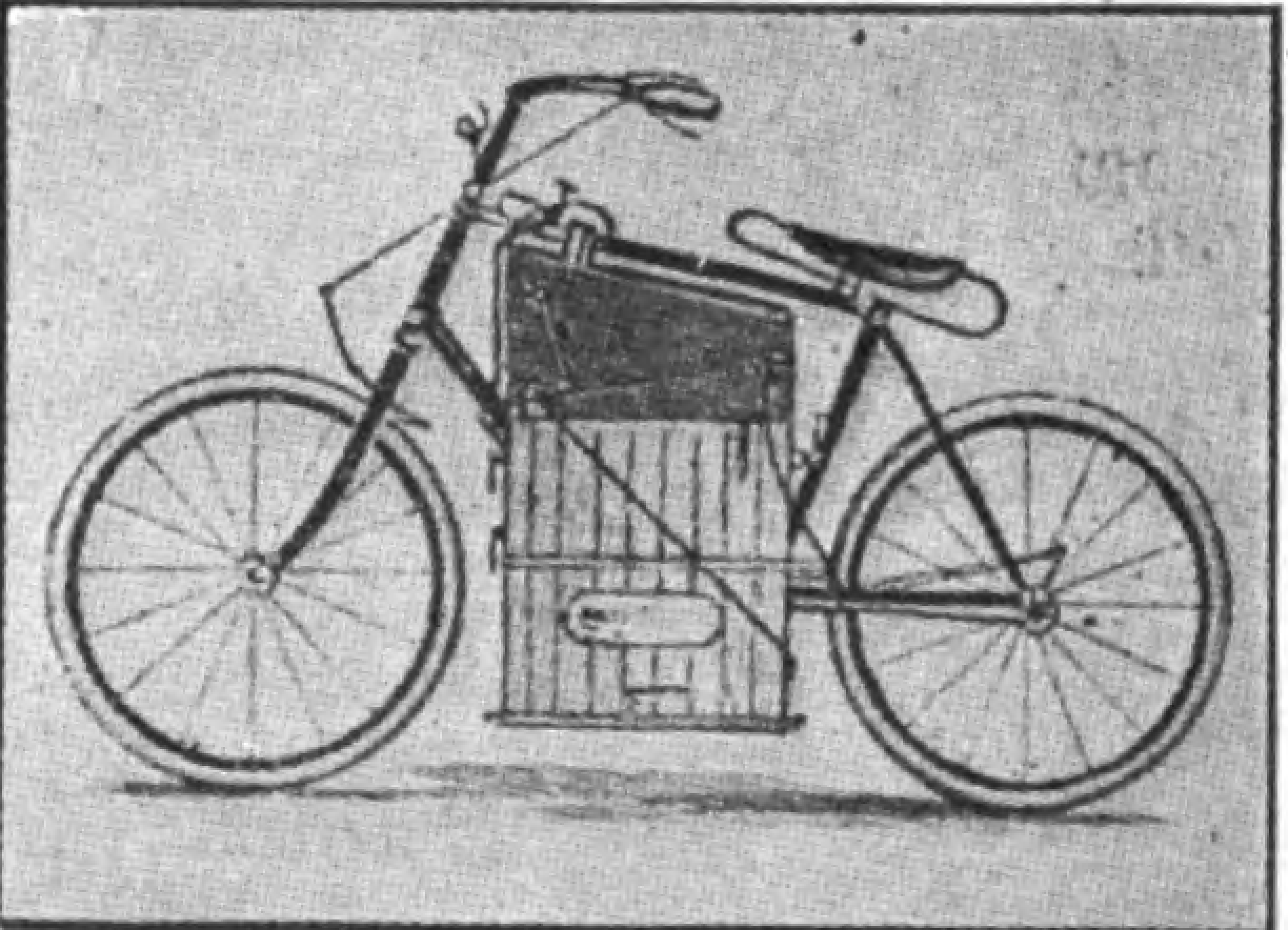
- Production: 1884–1896
- Engine: Single cylinder steam
- Bore / stroke: 1 3/4 by 4 inches (44 mm × 102 mm)
- Top speed: 40 mph (64 km/h)
- Power: 3 hp (2.2 kW) 8 hp (6.0 kW)
- Frame type: Pope Columbia bicycle
- Brakes: Spoon

Roper's second steam cycle was apparently constructed in 1884, and was further developed in 1896, when Colonel Albert Pope, owner of Pope Columbia bicycles safety bicycle, commissioned Roper to build a 'pacer' for his bicycle racing team. Motorized bicycle pacers had recently emerged with crude deDion-based gasoline engines, but these were unreliable and often disappointed racing fans. Pope supplied a Columbia frame to Roper, who added an improved single-cylinder coal fired steam engine to the center of the frame. The weight, including coal and water, was 150 lb (68 kg). The steam engine normally generated 150 pounds of steam pressure, but could go as high as 185 pounds, which the Boston Daily Globe in 1896 described as equivalent to 8 hp (6.0 kW). Roper was known to regularly ride this machine, which he called his 'self propeller', from his home at 299 Eustis Ave in Roxbury to the Boston harbor, a distance of 7 miles, the engine's maximum range. Roper claimed his machine could 'climb any hill and outrun any horse', and American Machinist magazine noted, "the exhaust from the stack was entirely invisible so far as steam was concerned; a slight noise was perceptible, but not to any disagreeable extent.".

Roper was asked to demonstrate his 'self propeller' at the Charles River velodrome, a banked concrete bicycle racing track, where he first paced the racing cyclists, then raced professional rider Nat Butler, easily outpacing the bicyclists with timed laps at around 30 mph (120.2sec/mile on the 1/3mile track). He was then encouraged to give a demonstration of maximum speed, and was timed at over 40 mph, when a 'sudden pallor' was seen on his face, and his machine wobbled to a stop, Roper falling off his cycle. He died at the track-side with his son Charles, of 'natural causes', at age 72.

This machine was on exhibit in the 1960s at Bellm's Cars of Yesterday in Sarasota, Florida. An 1894 Roper velocipede was lent from the R. J. Boudeman family collection to the Solomon R. Guggenheim Museum's 2001 expansion, Guggenheim Las Vegas, where The Art of the Motorcycle exhibition was the only show there until the expansion closed in 2003. It was the fourth venue for the motorcycle design show which had first opened at the Guggenheim New York in 1998, where the Michaux-Perreaux velocipede had been the first machine viewers saw upon entering the rotunda of the museum. Later, the Boudeman Roper velocipede was on view at the 2011 Deeley Motorcycle Exhibition in Vancouver. An 1894 Roper was offered for auction in January 2012, with a claimed high bid of $425,000.

== See also ==
- List of motorcycles in the Smithsonian Institution

== Notes ==
Years for the Michaux-Perreaux and Roper machines noted, if given.
