= Twistgrip =

Handle that can be twisted to operate a control, usually on a bike or motorcycle

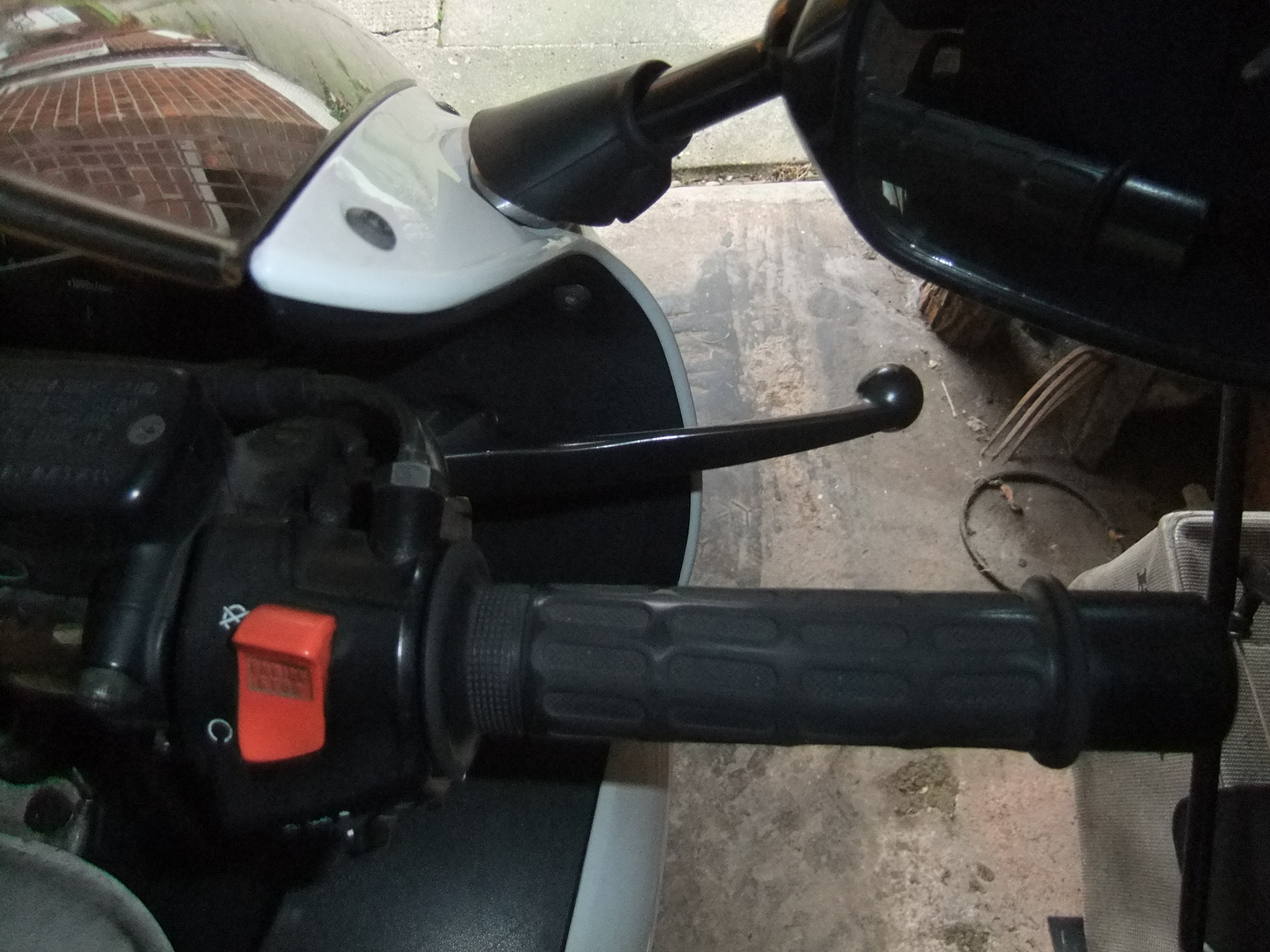
Motorcycle twistgrip

A twistgrip is a handle that can be twisted to operate a control. It is commonly found as a motorcycle's right handlebar grip to control the throttle, but is sometimes found elsewhere, such as on a bicycle as a gearshift, and in helicopters.

== History ==
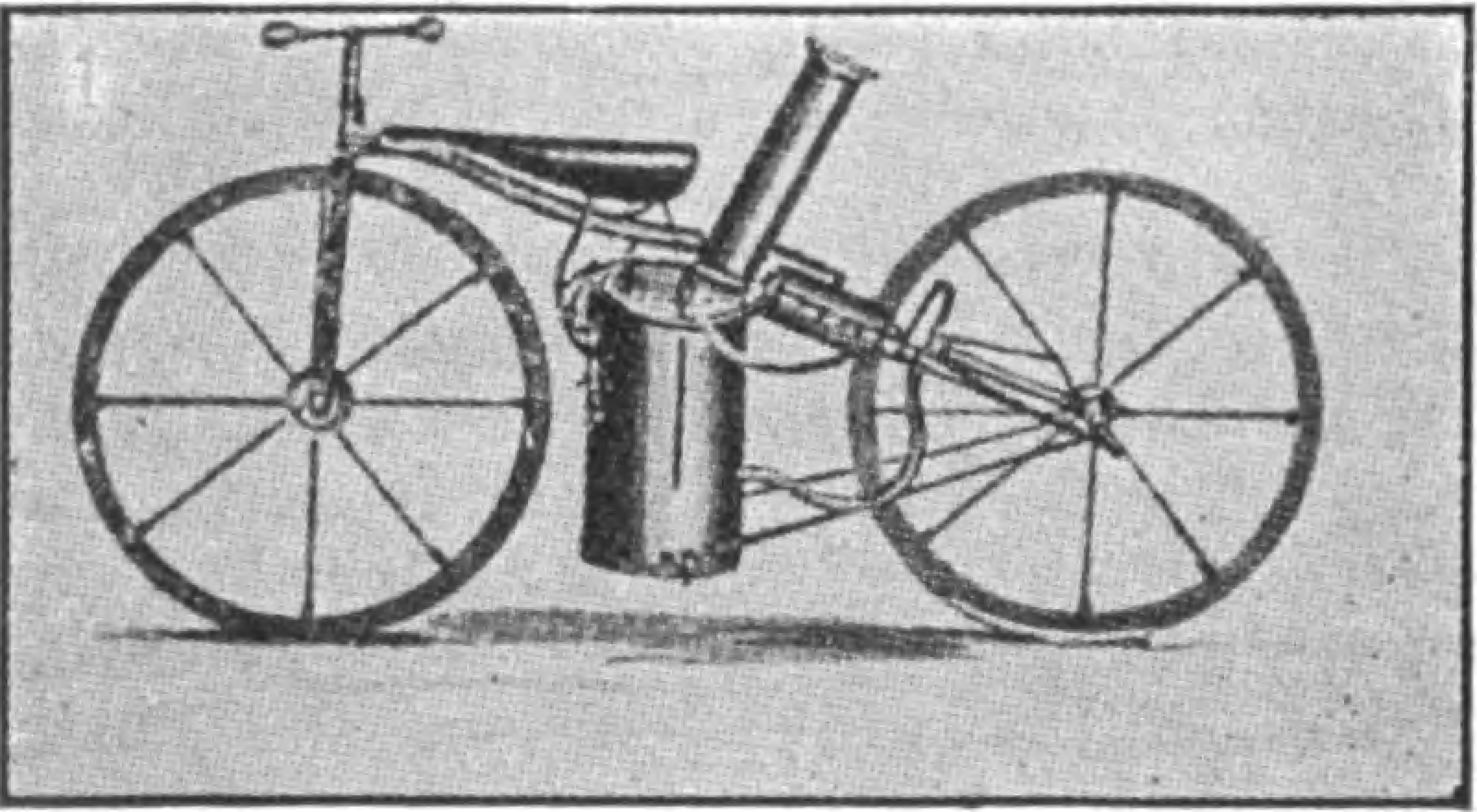
The Roper steam velocipede of 1867-69.

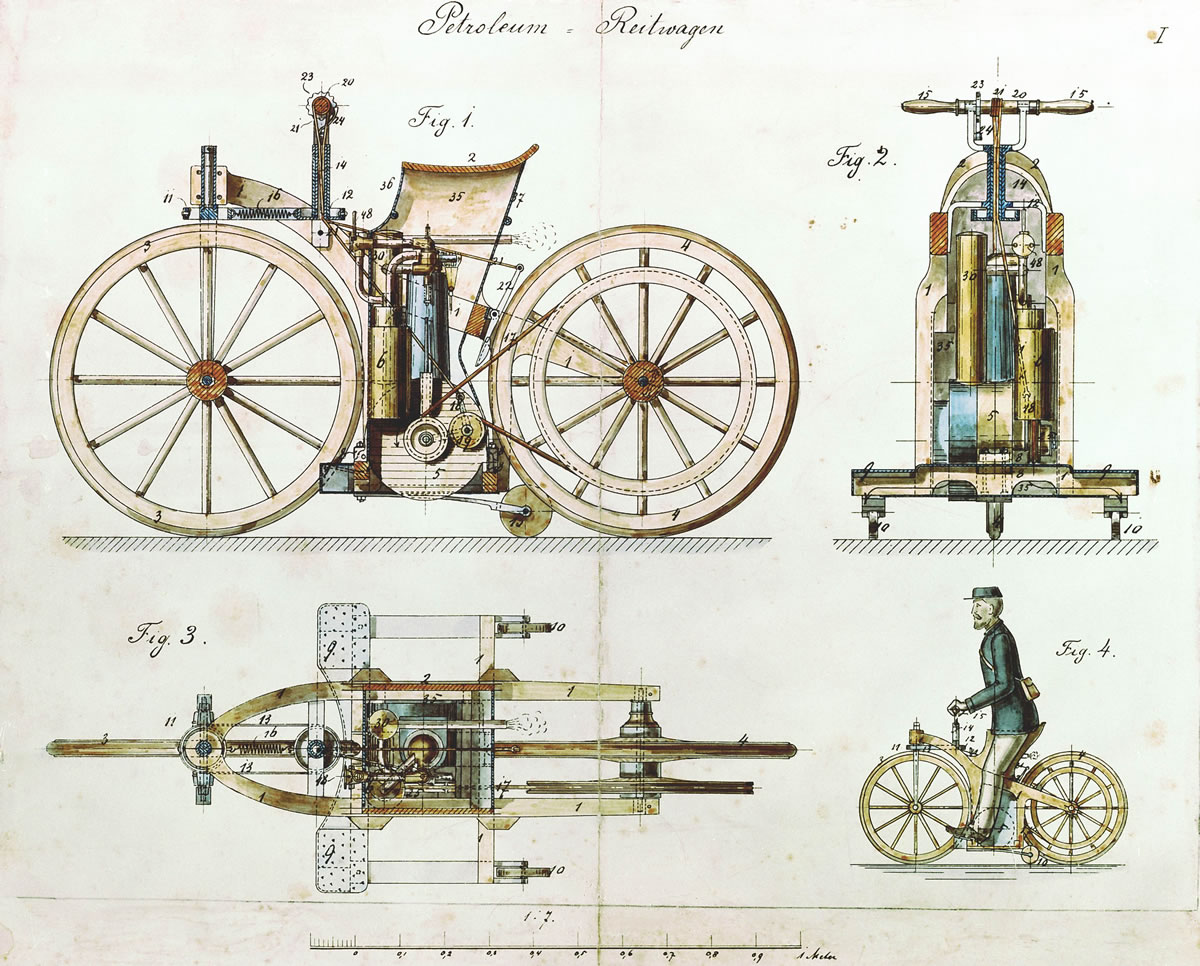
Drawings from 1884 showed a twist grip belt tensioner, complex steering linkage and used a belt drive. The working model had a simple handlebar and used a pinion gear drive.

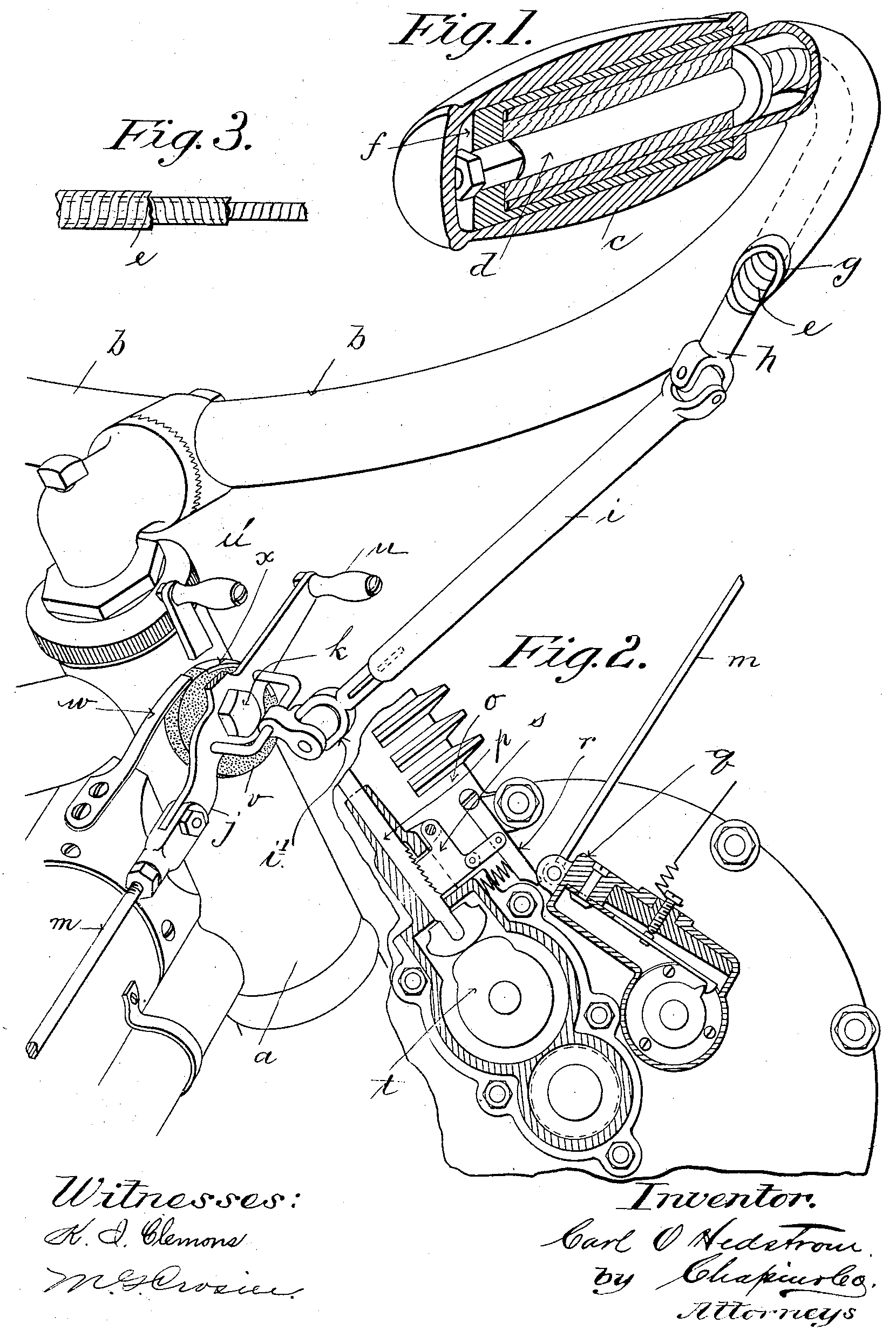
Patent drawing from US Patent 765138 which was held by Indian

The first use of the twist grip throttle control was on the Roper steam velocipede of 1867-69. Rather than a sleeve that rotated around the handlebar, Sylvester H. Roper's steam motorcycle's entire handlebar rotated, with a dual mode operation. When rotated forward it opened the throttle, and when rotated backwards it applied the spoon brake. Motorcycle Consumer News design columnist Glynn Kerr said that pioneering this technology was a point in favor of the Roper's precedence as the first motorcycle, in response to Cycle World Technical Editor Kevin Cameron's position that the 1885 Daimler Reitwagen was more deserving because it used the more successful technology, internal combustion rather than steam. The design drawings of the Reitwagen depicted a twist grip speed control, also applying the brake when turned one way, but when turned the other way, it would have tensioned the belt drive's idler pulley, applying power to the rear wheel in the manner of a clutch. The actual working model, however, did not have the twist grip, belt drive, or brakes.

Glenn Curtiss, unlikely to have been aware of the prior uses of the twist grip, used it in his 1904 motorcycle land-speed record machine, and is sometimes credited as the inventor of the device. Indian claimed in their advertisements, also for their 1904 models, to have invented the twist grip. Whether Curtiss, Gottlieb Daimler, or Roper were the true inventors, the 1904 Indian would be the earliest use of the device on a production motorcycle.

Motorcycle throttles are spring-loaded to cut the engine power back to idling when the twistgrip is released. Formerly some motorcycle throttle twistgrips had a screw that could be screwed in to make the twistgrip stay still when released (e.g. for the rider to signal right turn), but a ruling from Brussels forbade that on safety grounds.
