= MV Agusta Liberty =

Light motorcycle built in Italy from 1962 to 1969

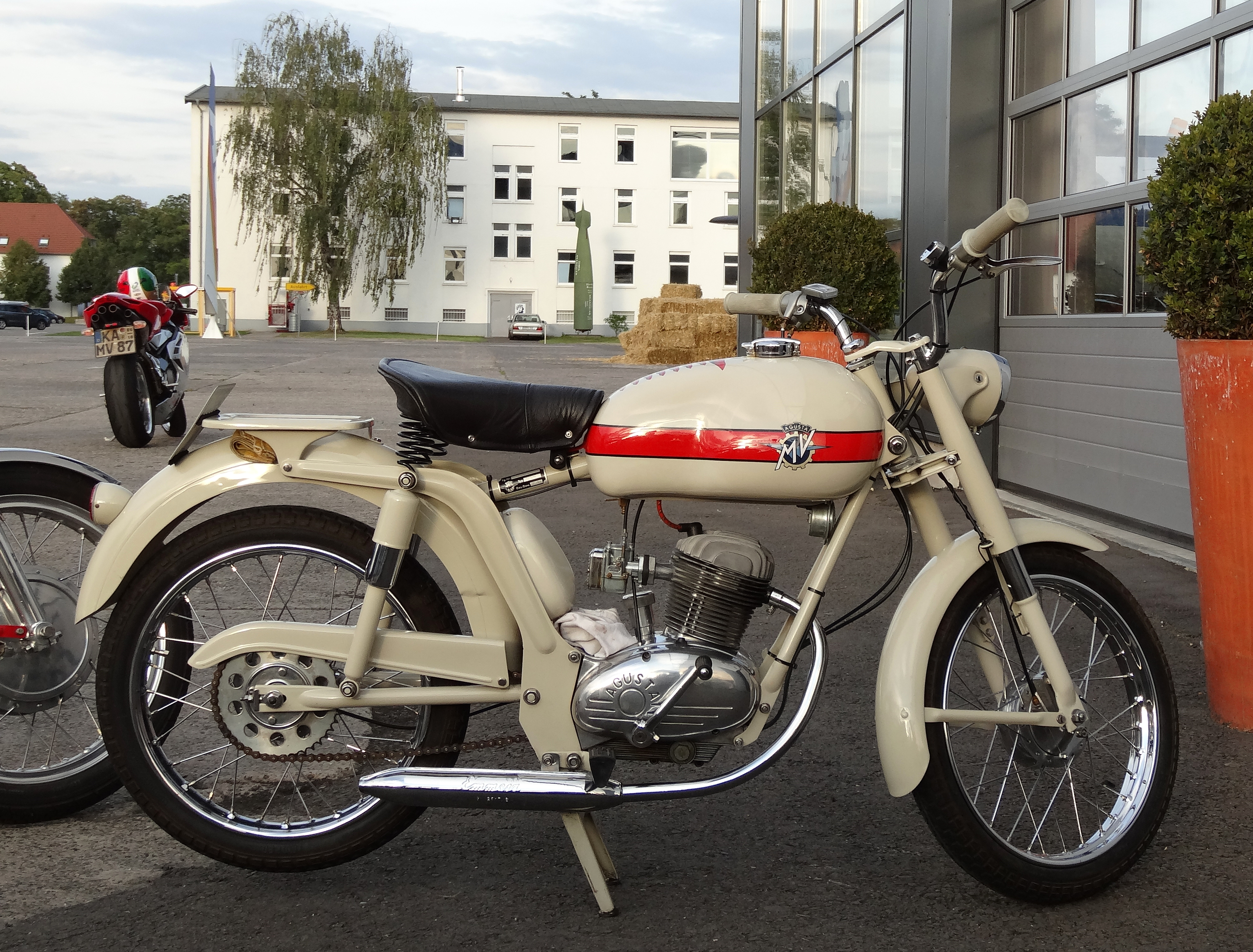
- MV Agusta Liberty
- Manufacturer: MV Agusta
- Production: 1962-1969
- Class: Standard, sports
- Engine: 47.8 cc (3 cu in) air-cooled pushrod single-cylinder four-stroke
- Bore / stroke: 39 mm × 40 mm (1.5 in × 1.6 in)
- Compression ratio: 7.5:1
- Top speed: Italy: 40 km/h Export: 60 km/h
- Power: 1.5 bhp @ 4,500 rpm
- Ignition type: Magneto
- Transmission: Wet multi-plate clutch, 3 gears (4 gears on Series 2 "Sport"), chain drive
- Frame type: Double cradle frame
- Suspension: Front: Telescopic forks Rear: Swinging arm with hydraulic shock absorbers
- Brakes: Drum brakes 104 mm diameter
- Tires: Series 1: 2.00 x 16; Series 2: 2.00 x 18
- Wheelbase: 1110 mm
- Dimensions: L: 1790 mm W: 710 mm
- Weight: 58 kg (dry)
- Fuel capacity: 9 litres

The MV Agusta 50 Liberty was a light motorcycle built in the MV Agusta factory in Cascina Costa di Samarate, Italy from 1962 to 1969.

== Background ==
After the Nuovo codice della strada (traffic code) came into force, motorcycles with a cylinder capacity of less than 50 cc and a maximum speed of 40 km/h were the only motor vehicles that could be used by people without a driving license.

Some Italian motorcycle manufacturers, seeing their production fall due to the availability of low-cost utility cars, decided to enter the light motorcycle sector, creating economical models equipped with refined and robust four-stroke engines.

== Overview ==
As a motorcycle aimed at youngsters not old enough to hold a licence, the MV technicians focused giving the machine "real" motorcycle looks. The chassis and bodywork were of a generous size for its engine size. The "Liberty" was offered in two versions, the "Turismo" and the "Sport Speciale", priced at 112,000 and 114,000 Lire respectively. This was quite inexpensive, in relation to the technical refinement of the engine and chassis.

For the domestic versions of the "Liberty", to the "Code", the maximum speed was 40 km/h, however, overseas version were capable of 60 km/h. Initially fuel consumption of 1 litre of petrol per 100 km was claimed, late a more credible consumption of 1.5 liters per 100 km was claimed.

A second series was introduced in 1966, 18" wheels replaced the original 16" items and the "Sport" received a 4-speed gearbox. A more upmarket "America" model was introduced.

The "Liberty" was not a great commercial success; 5,292 were produced, of which 2,000 were the "America" model and 3,292 "Sport".

== Technical details ==
The Liberty's engine was an air-cooled pushrod single-cylinder four-stroke with a bore and stroke of 39 x 42 mm giving a displacement of 47,7 cc. Compression ratio was 7.5:1 and the ignition was provided by a magneto. Power output was 1.5 bhp @ 4,500 rpm.

A wet multi-plate clutch was driven by gears from the crankshaft. There was initially a three-speed gearbox, but sports models got 4 speeds from 1966. Gears were controlled by a handlebar twistgrip. The rear wheel was driven by a chain.

The MV Agusta had a double cradle frame and telescopic forks were used. At the rear there was a swinging arm with hydraulic shock absorbers.
