= Daimler Reitwagen =

First motorcycle, 1885

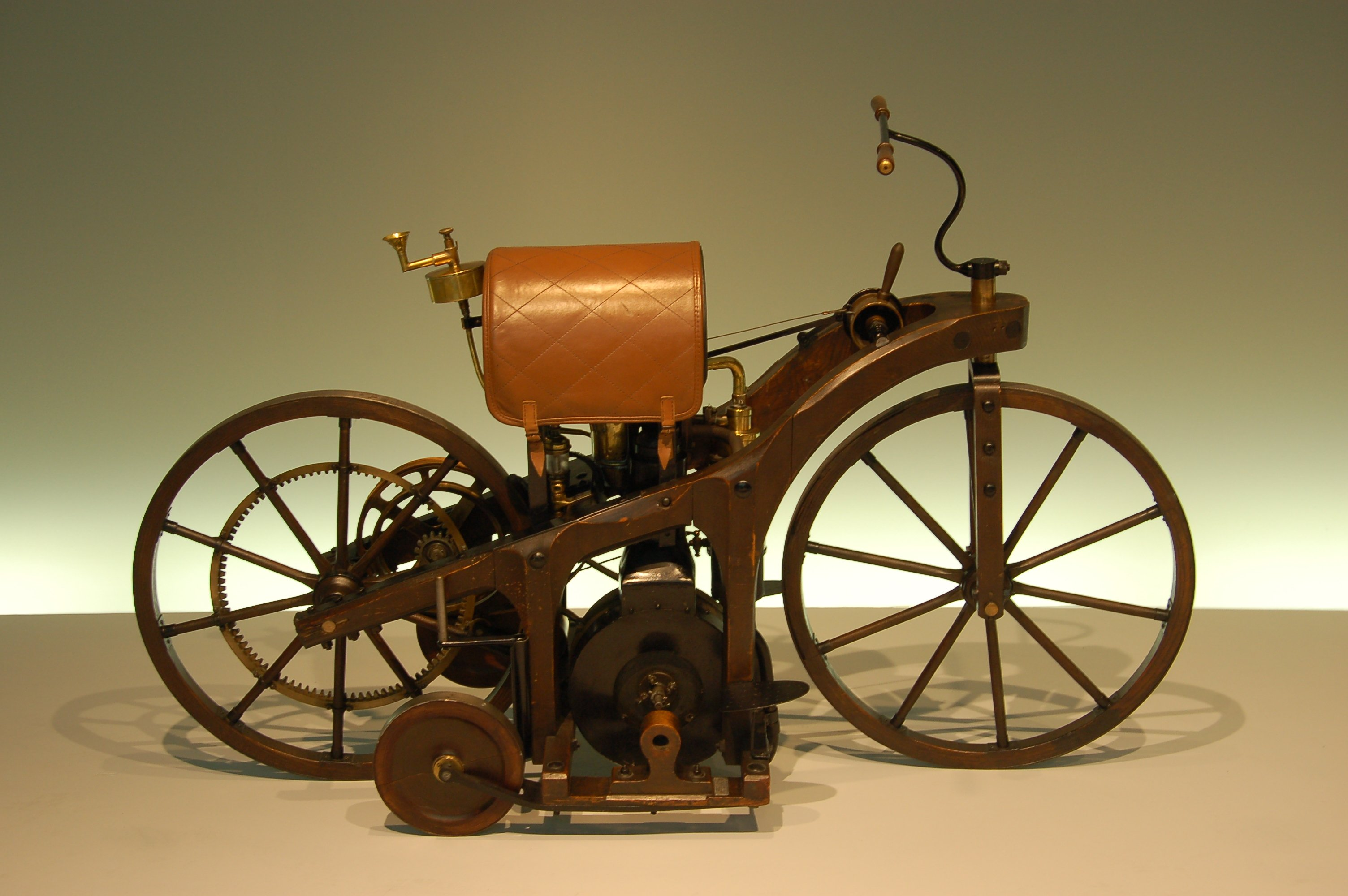
- A Reitwagen replica at the Mercedes-Benz Museum
- Manufacturer: Gottlieb Daimler and Wilhelm Maybach
- Also called: Einspur "single track" Fahrzeug mit Gas bezw. Petroleum Kraftmaschine "Vehicle with gas or petrol engine"
- Production: 1885
- Assembly: Cannstatt
- Engine: 264 cc (16.1 cu in) air-cooled four-stroke single. Crank start.
- Bore / stroke: 58 mm × 100 mm (2.3 in × 3.9 in)
- Top speed: 11 km/h (6.8 mph)
- Power: 370 W (0.5 hp) @ 600 rpm 6.7 newton-metres (4.9 lbf⋅ft)
- Ignition type: Hot tube
- Transmission: Single speed, belt drive (1885); Two speed, belt primary, pinion gear final drive (1886)
- Frame type: Wood beam
- Suspension: None
- Brakes: Front: none Rear: shoe
- Tires: Iron over wood rim, wood spokes.
- Rake, trail: 0°, 0 mm
- Weight: 90 kg (200 lb) (dry)

The Daimler Reitwagen ("riding car") or Einspur ("single track") was a motor vehicle made by Gottlieb Daimler and Wilhelm Maybach in 1885. It is widely recognized as the first motorcycle. Daimler is often called "the father of the motorcycle" for this invention. Even when the steam powered two-wheelers that preceded the Reitwagen, the Michaux-Perreaux and Roper of 1867–1869, and the 1884 Copeland, are considered motorcycles, it remains nonetheless the first gasoline internal combustion motorcycle, and the forerunner of all vehicles, land, sea and air, that use its overwhelmingly popular engine type.

== Status as first motorcycle ==
The Reitwagen's status as the first motorcycle rests on whether the definition of motorcycle includes having an internal combustion engine. The Oxford English Dictionary uses this criterion. Even by that definition, the use of four wheels instead of two raises doubts. If the outriggers are accepted as auxiliary stabilizers, they point to a deeper issue in bicycle and motorcycle dynamics, in that Daimler's testbed needed the training wheels because it did not employ the then well-understood principles of rake and trail. For this and other reasons motoring author David Burgess-Wise called the Daimler-Maybach "a crude makeshift", saying that "as a bicycle, it was 20 years out of date." Cycle World's Technical Editor Kevin Cameron, however, maintains that steam power was a dead end and the Reitwagen was the first motorcycle because it hit upon the successful engine type, saying, "History follows things that succeed, not things that fail."

Enrico Bernardi's 1884 one-cylinder gasoline-engined tricycle, the Motrice Pia, is considered by a few sources as the first gasoline internal combustion motorcycle, and in fact the first ever internal combustion vehicle, so Siegfried Marcus built his internal combustion vehicle in 1870. Bernardi's work was more of a motorbike, mounting his engine on the tricycle of his son, while Daimler designed and built the Reitwagen chassis to fit the needs of his machine and so the first full motorcycle. The Motrice Pia is not mentioned in any mainstream sources. While there is some discussion in mainstream sources of the merits of Michaux-Perreaux steam velocipede or Roper steam velocipede versus the Reitwagen, there is no debate that considers the merits of the Motrice Pia. In the end it was the Reitwagen that inspired following designs and started the motorcycle industry.

== Development ==
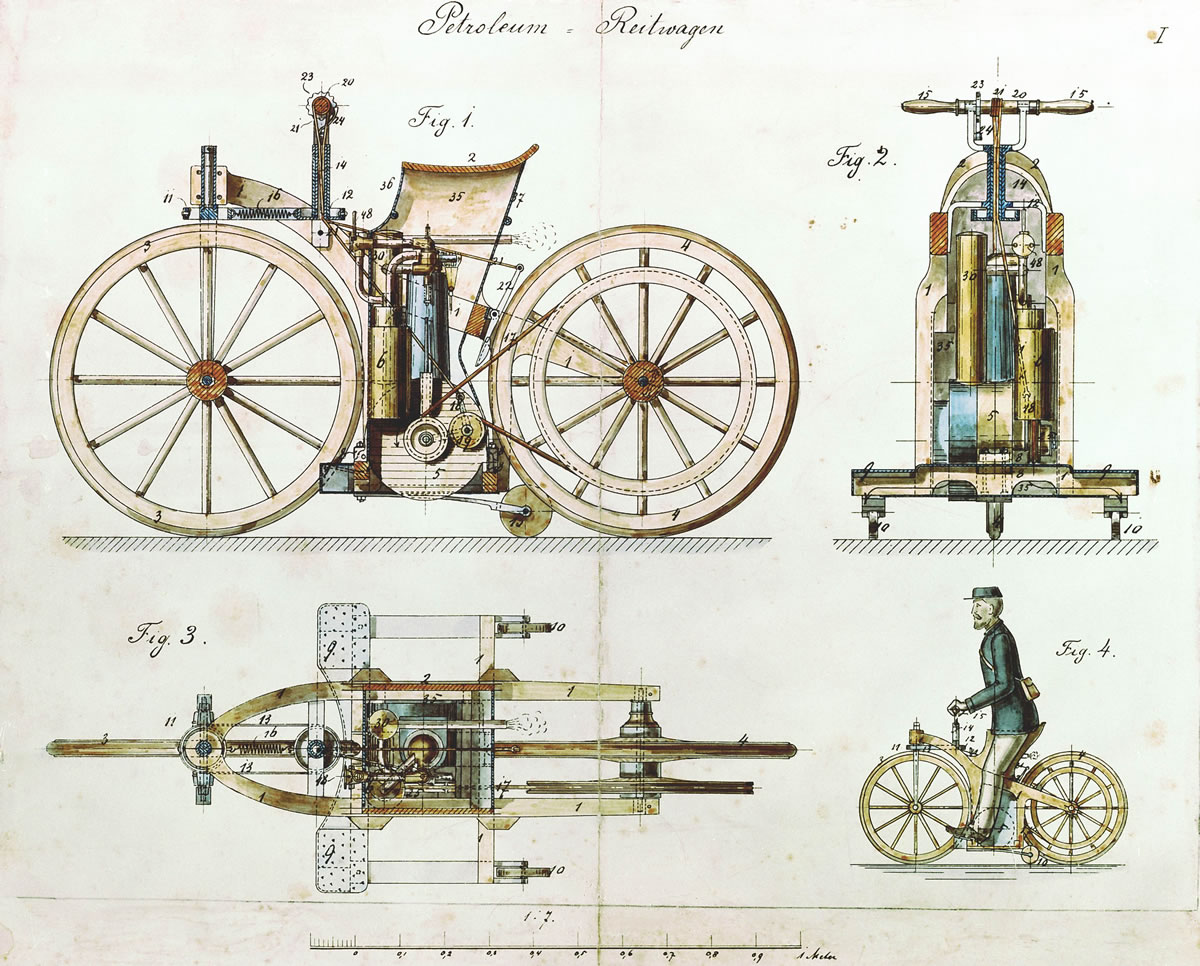
Drawings from 1884 showed a twist grip belt tensioner, a complex steering linkage and a belt drive. The working model had a simple handlebar and used a pinion gear drive.

Gottlieb Daimler visited Paris in 1861 and spent time observing the first internal combustion engine developed by Etienne Lenoir. This experience would be helpful later when he joined Nikolaus August Otto's company N.A. Otto & Cie (Otto and Company).

In 1872 Gottlieb Daimler had become the director of N.A. Otto & Cie, the world's largest engine manufacturer. Otto's company had created the first successful gaseous fuel engine in 1864 and in 1876 finally succeeded in creating a compressed charge gaseous petroleum engine due to the direction of Daimler and his plant engineer Wilhelm Maybach. Because of this success Otto's company name was changed to Gasmotoren Fabrik Deutz (Now Deutz AG) the next year when the plant was moved.

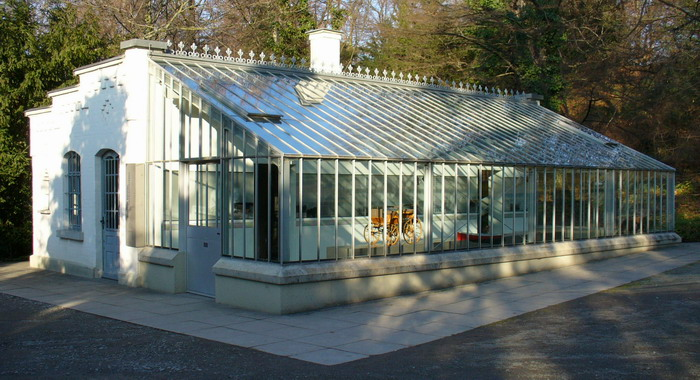
The Garden House in Cannstatt

Otto had no interest in making engines small enough to be used in transportation. After some dispute over the direction design of the engines should take Daimler left Deutz and took Maybach with him. Together they moved to the town Cannstatt where they began work on a "high speed explosion engine." This goal was achieved in 1883 with the development of their first engine, a horizontal cylinder engine that ran on petroleum naptha. The Otto engines were incapable of running at speeds much higher than 150 to 200 rpm and were not designed to be throttled. Daimler's goal was to build an engine small enough that it could be used to power a wide range of transportation equipment with a minimum rotation speed of 600 rpm. This was realized with the 1883 engine. The next year Daimler and Maybach developed a vertical cylinder model which is called the Grandfather Clock engine and achieved 700 rpm and soon 900 rpm was achieved. This was made possible by the Hot-Tube ignition which was developed by an Englishman named Watson. The electrical systems of that era were unreliable and too slow to allow those speeds.

Having achieved the goals of producing a throttling engine with high enough RPM that was small enough to be used in transportation Daimler and Maybach built the 1884 engine into a two-wheeled test frame which was patented as the "Petroleum Reitwagen" (Petroleum Riding Car). This test machine demonstrated the feasibility of a liquid petroleum engine which used a compressed fuel charge to power an automobile. Daimler is often referred to as the Father of the Automobile.

"The first motorcycle looks like an instrument of torture", wrote Melissa Holbrook Pierson, describing a vehicle that was created along the way to Daimler's real goal, a four-wheeled car, and earning him credit as the inventor of the motorcycle "malgré lui," in spite of himself.

Daimler had founded an experimental workshop in the garden shed behind his house in Cannstatt near Stuttgart in 1882. Together with his employee Maybach they developed a compact, high-speed single-cylinder engine, patented on April 3, 1885, and called "grandfather clock engine." It had a float metered carburetor, used mushroom intake valves which were opened by the suction of the piston's intake stroke, and instead of an electrical ignition system, it used hot tube ignition, a platinum tube running into the combustion chamber, heated by an external open flame. It could also run on coal gas. It used twin flywheels and had an aluminum crankcase.

Daimler's and Maybach's next step was to install the engine in a test bed to prove the viability of their engine in a vehicle. Their goal was to learn what the engine could do, and not to create a motorcycle; it was just that the engine prototype was not yet powerful enough for a full size carriage.

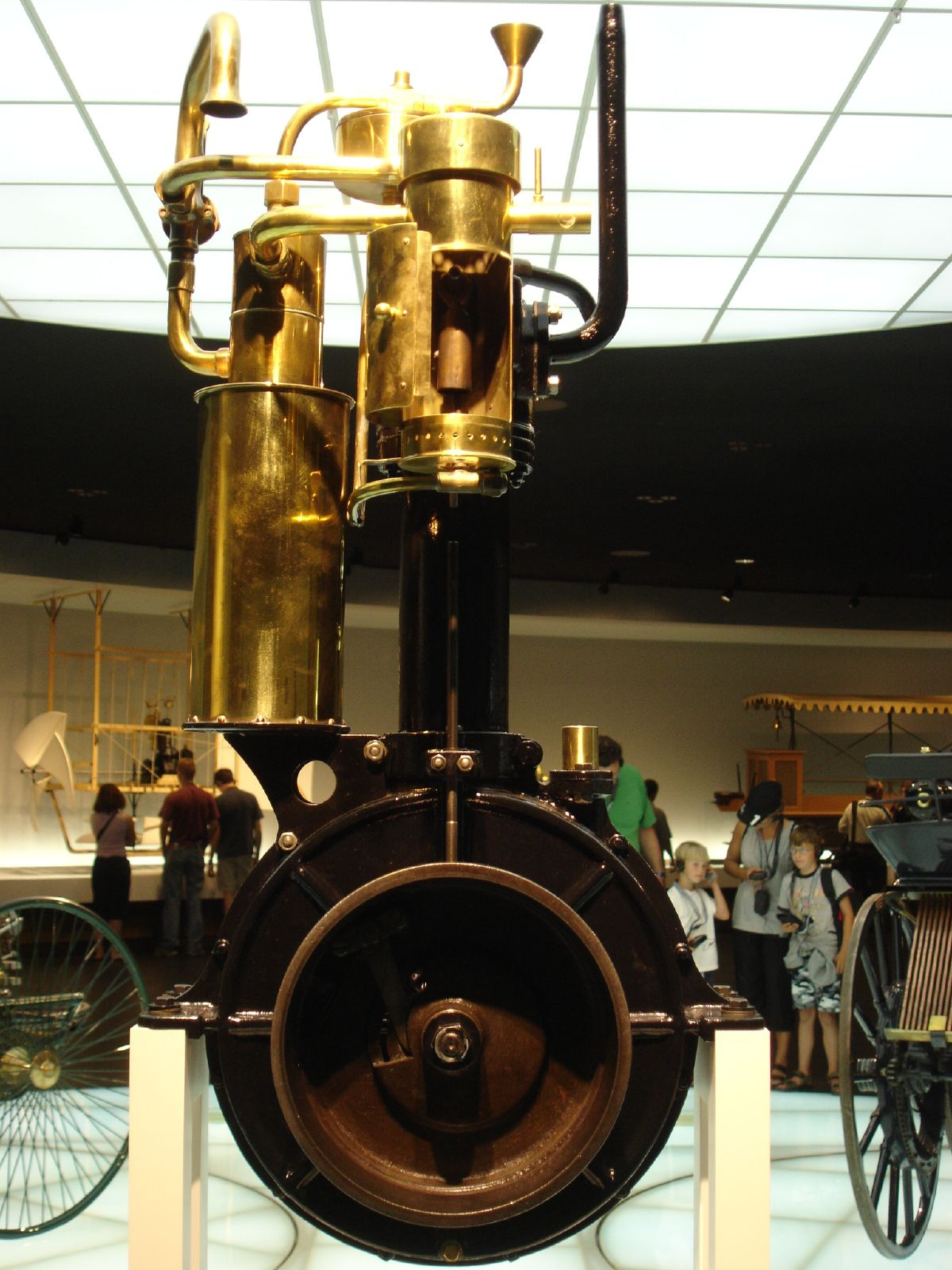
The Daimler-Maybach grandfather clock engine of 1885

The original design of 1884 used a belt drive, and twist grip on the handlebars which applied the brake when turned one way and tensioned the drive belt, applying power to the wheel, when turned the other way. Roper's velocipede of the late 1860s used a similar two way twistgrip handlebar control. The plans also called for steering linkage shafts that made two right angle bends connected with gears, but the actual working model used a simple handlebar without the twist grip or gear linkage. The design was patented on August 29, 1885.

It had a 264-cubic-centimetre (16.1 cu in) single-cylinder Otto cycle four-stroke engine mounted on rubber blocks, with two iron tread wooden wheels and a pair of spring-loaded outrigger wheels to help it remain upright. Its engine output of 0.37 kW (0.5 hp) at 600 rpm gave it a speed of about 11 km/h (6.8 mph). Daimler's 17-year-old son, Paul, rode it first on November 18, 1885, going 5–12 kilometres (3.1–7.5 mi), from Cannstatt to Untertürkheim, Germany. The seat caught fire on that excursion, the engine's hot tube ignition being located directly underneath. Over the winter of 1885–1886 the belt drive was upgraded to a two-stage, two-speed transmission with a belt primary drive and the final drive using a ring gear on the back wheel. By 1886 the Reitwagen had served its purpose and was abandoned in favor of further development on four wheeled vehicles.

== Replicas ==
The original Reitwagen was destroyed in the Cannstatt Fire that razed the Daimler-Motoren-Gesellschaft Seelberg-Cannstatt plant in 1903, but several replicas exist in collections at the Mercedes-Benz Museum in Stuttgart, the Deutsches Museum in Munich, the Honda Collection Hall at the Twin Ring Motegi facility in Japan, the AMA Motorcycle Hall of Fame in Ohio, the Deeley Motorcycle Exhibition in Vancouver, Canada, and in Melbourne, Australia. The Deutsches Museum lent their replica to the Guggenheim Las Vegas The Art of the Motorcycle exhibition in 2001. The replicas vary as to which version they follow. The one at the AMA Hall of Fame is larger than the original and uses the complex belt tensioner and steering linkage seen in the 1884 plans, while the Deutsches Museum's replica has the simple handlebar, as well as the ring gear on the rear wheel. KTM have borrowed the replica Reitwagen from the Mercedes-Benz Museum and have it on show in their "Living Workshop" at their Motohall Museum in Mattighofen, Austria
