= Sylvester H. Roper =

American inventor and builder of vehicles

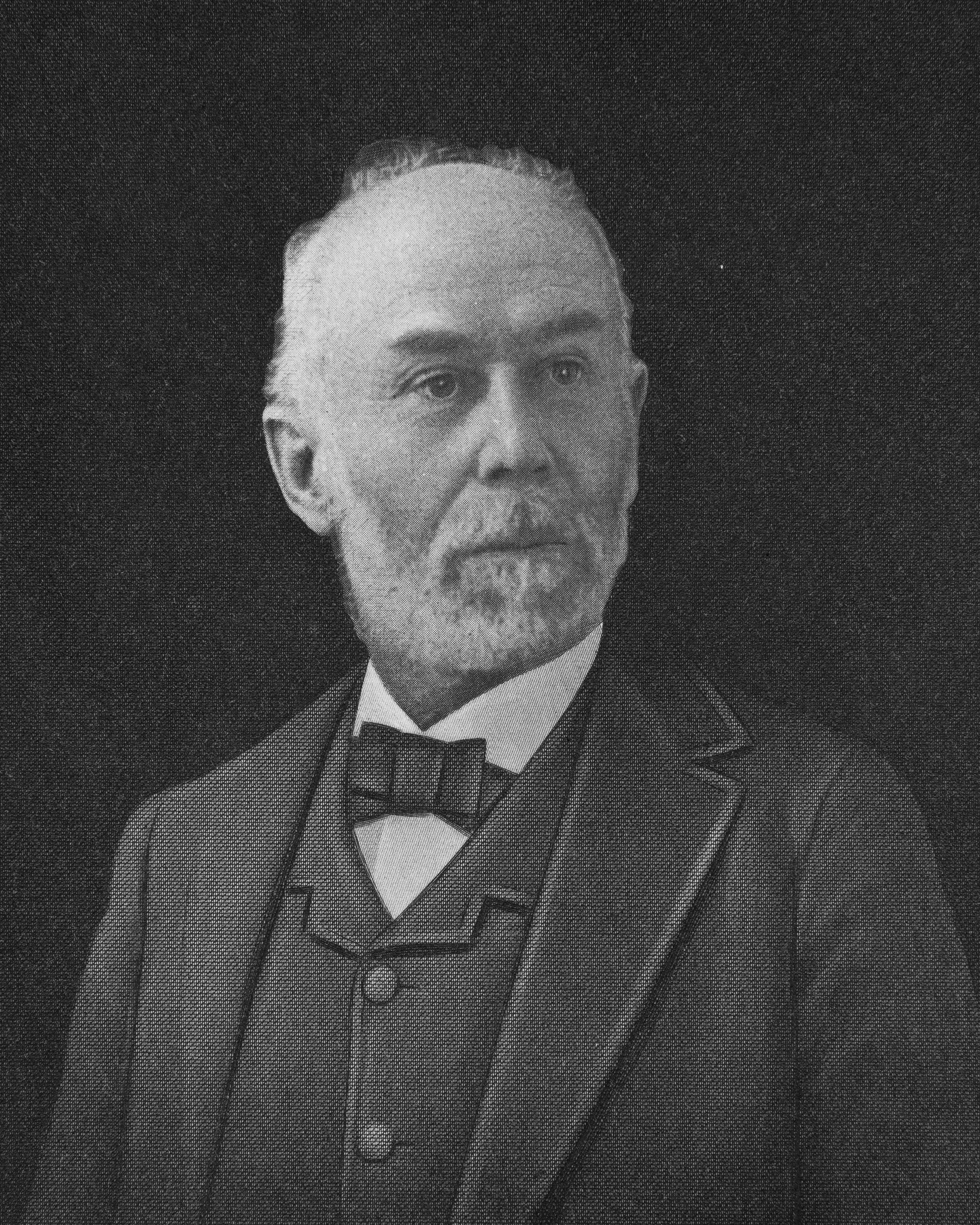
- Roper circa 1890
- Born: November 24, 1823; Francestown, New Hampshire, U.S.
- Died: June 1, 1896 (aged 72); Cambridge, Massachusetts, U.S.
- Occupations: Machinist; inventor
- Known for: Roper steam velocipede, repeating shotgun, shotgun choke
- Spouse: Almira D. Hill
- Children: 1
- Awards: Motorcycle Hall of Fame (2002)

Sylvester Howard Roper (November 24, 1823 – June 1, 1896) was an American inventor and a pioneering builder of early automobiles and motorcycles from Boston, Massachusetts. In 1863 he built a steam carriage, one of the earliest automobiles. The Roper steam velocipede of 1867–1869 may have been the first motorcycle, for which he was inducted into the Motorcycle Hall of Fame in 2002. He is also the inventor of the shotgun choke and a revolver repeating shotgun.

== Early life ==
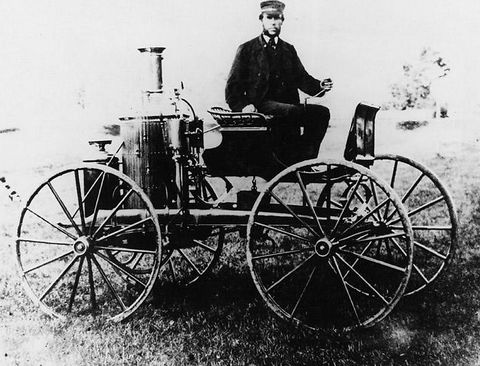
William Wallace Austin driving Roper's second steam carriage, made about 1863.

Sylvester H. Roper's father, Merrick, was a cabinetmaker; he married Sylvester's mother Susan Fairbanks in 1817. Sylvester had an older brother who was a house painter, two younger sisters, and a younger brother who became a machinist at the Singer Sewing Machine Manufactory in Boston, then later a jeweler. Sylvester Roper was born on November 24, 1823. From an early age he displayed mechanical talent. At age 12 he made a stationary steam engine, even though he had never seen one before in person; this invention was kept on display in the laboratory of the Francestown Academy. At age 14, he built a locomotive engine, and only afterward saw such an engine for the first time in Nashua. Roper left Francestown at a young age and worked as a machinist, first in Nashua, then in Manchester, New York, and Worcester. He married Almira D. Hill on April 20, 1845, in Providence, Rhode Island. In 1854 he moved to Boston, Massachusetts living in the Roxbury neighborhood at 299 Eustis Street.

== Inventor ==
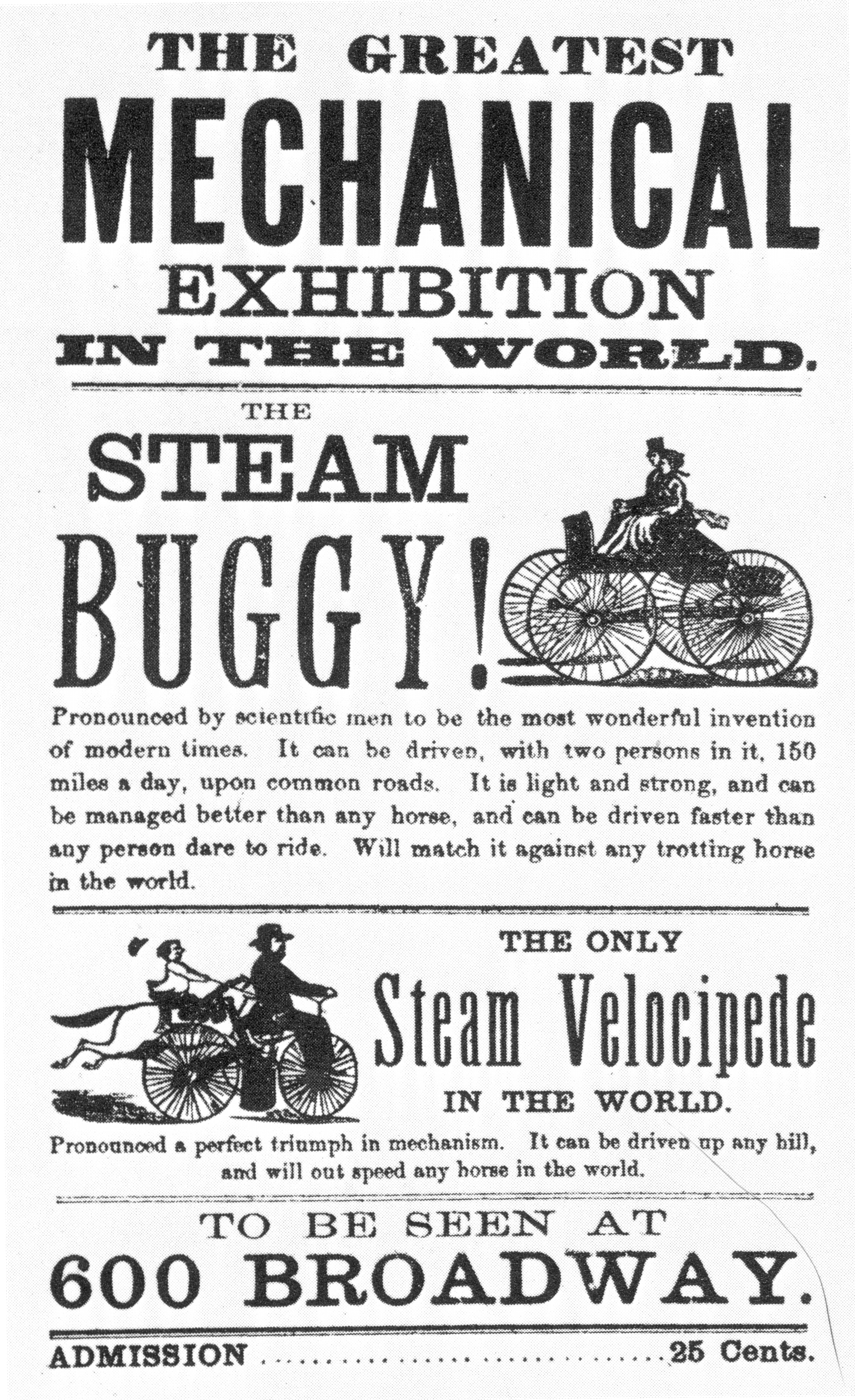
Handbill for Roper steam demonstration.

About the same time he came to Boston, Roper invented his Handstitch Sewing Machine. In 1861 he invented a hot air engine and filed several patents for hot air engines. He eventually succeeded in building engines ranging from 1 to 4 horsepower. By 1869 over 200 of Roper's air engines were in operation. Roper worked for the Springfield Armory during the Civil War. Roper's work eventually came to the attention of other inventors and engineers of the era, including Elias Howe, Alvan Clark, Christopher Miner Spencer. Roper was observed driving his steam carriage around Boston in 1863. One such 1863 carriage went to the Henry Ford Museum.

Roper invented the first shotgun choke, short tubes that could be threaded onto, or removed from, the outside of the shotgun barrel to vary the shot spread to suit different targets and ranges. Roper and Christopher Miner Spencer were granted a joint patent for a repeating shotgun mechanism on April 4, 1882. Later, on April 21, 1885, Roper alone obtained a patent for an improved shotgun loading mechanism. Roper and his son, Charles, designed a factory producing screw-making equipment, which Charles Roper continued to manage after his father's death.

== Death while riding ==
On June 1, 1896, Roper rode one of his later velocipede models, a Pope Manufacturing Company Columbia bicycle with a steam engine added, to the Charles River bicycle track, near Harvard Bridge, Cambridge, Massachusetts, where he made several laps, pacing bicyclists there, including professional rider Tom Butler who could not keep up with the steam powered machine. Roper was clocked at 2 minutes 1.4 seconds for the flying mile, for a top speed 40 mph (64 km/h) He was seen to be unstable and then fall on the track, suffering a head wound, and was found dead. After autopsy, the cause of death was found to be heart failure, although it is unknown if the crash was the cause of the stress on his heart, or if his heart failed prior to the crash.

== List of patents ==
Number	Title	Issue date	Co-inventor
U.S. patent 2,848	Padlock	November 9, 1842
U.S. patent 34,723	Improvement in Hot-Air Engines	March 18, 1862
U.S. patent 53,881	Improvement In Revolving Fire-Arms	April 10, 1866
U.S. patent 79,861	Improvements In Detachable Muzzle For Shot-Guns	July 14, 1868
U.S. patent 94,135	Improvement In Knitting-Machine	August 24, 1869
U.S. patent 117,931	Improvement In Knitting-Machines	August 8, 1871
U.S. patent 255,894	Magazine Fire-Arm	April 4, 1882	Christopher M. Spencer
U.S. patent 262,321	Metal-Screw Machine	August 8, 1882	Charles F. Roper
U.S. patent 300,736	Metal-Screw Machine	June 17, 1884	Charles F. Roper
U.S. patent 409,429	Magazine-Gun	August 20, 1889
U.S. patent 413,734	Magazine Fire-Arm	October 29, 1889
U.S. patent 514,094	Fire-Escape	February 6, 1894
U.S. patent 516,117	Fire Escape	March 6, 1894
