= Ligroin =

Chemical compound

Names
- IUPAC name Ligroin

Identifiers
CAS Number	8032-32-4
UNII	5OQ4BMR99T

Properties
Boiling point	90–140 °C (194–284 °F)
- Except where otherwise noted, data are given for materials in their standard state (at 25 °C [77 °F], 100 kPa). Infobox references

Ligroin is a distilled petroleum product. The fraction is also called heavy naphtha. These may be called light naphtha.

The name ligroin (or ligroine or ligroïne) appeared as early as 1866. (Note: The name "ligroin" was coined in the United States: Heppe, G., ed. (1890). Klemens Merck's Warenlexikon für Handel, Industrie und Gewerbe [Klemens Merck's dictionary of commodities for commerce, industry, and trade] (in German). Leipzig, Germany: G. A. Gloeckner. p. 349. From p. 349: "Ligroine; der in Amerika erfundene Name für einen der flüchtigeren Teile des rohen Petroleums, … " (Ligroin: the name that was coined in America for one of the more volatile parts of crude petroleum, … ); Early use in English: (Editorial staff) (24 October 1866). "Polytechnic Association of the American Institute". The American Artisan and Patent Record. 3: 389. From p. 389: "Dr. Van der Weyde then exhibited some samples of the products of distillation of tar, and a safety-lamp for burning the lighter hydro-carbons, which is mainly a reproduction of the "Ligroine" lamp invented and put into the market first by C. Schreiber in Munich (Bavaria), and described in the March number of Dingler's Polytechnic Journal."; See also: Van der Weyde, P. H. (7 November 1866). "Uses of refuse acid of petroleum distilleries – oxydability of petroleum". The American Artisan and Patent Record. 4: 6.; Early use in German: Schafhäutl (1866). "Ueber die neue Li-gro-ine- oder Petroleum-Gaslampe" [On the new ligroin or petroleum gas lamp]. Dinglers Polytechnisches Journal (in German). 179: 472–475. From p. 474: "Das einzige Gefährliche ist die Aufbewahrung des Leuchtstoffes, der sogenannten Li-gro-ine selbst. Diese Naphta oder Li-gro-ine muß, wenn in großen Quantitäten vorhanden, in wohl verschlossenen Gefäßen aufbewahrt werden." (The one danger is the storage of the lamp fuel, the so-called "ligroin" itself. This naphtha or "ligroin" must, if present in large quantities, be stored in well sealed containers.))

== Use as fuel ==
Ligroin was used to refuel the world's first production automobile, the Benz Patent-Motorwagen, on a long distance journey between Mannheim and Pforzheim. Bertha Benz added ligroin to the vehicle at a pharmacy in Wiesloch.

The first functional diesel engine could also run on ligroin.

== See also ==
- White spirit
