= Gottlieb Daimler =

German engineer, industrialist and automotive pioneer (1834–1900)

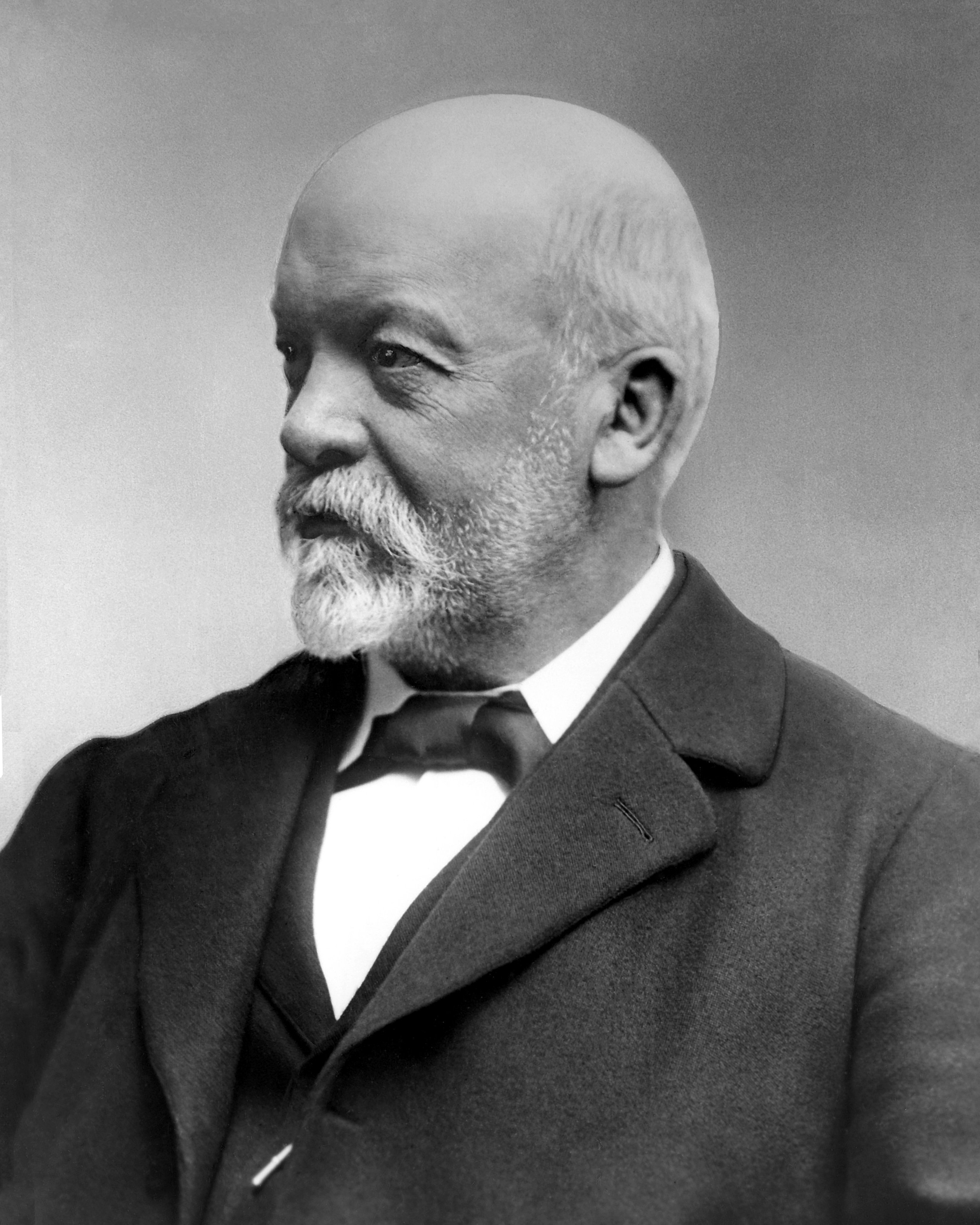
- Gottlieb Daimler in the 1890s
- Born: Gottlieb Wilhelm Daimler; 17 March 1834; Schorndorf, Württemberg, German Confederation
- Died: 6 March 1900 (aged 65); Cannstatt, Württemberg, German Empire
- Occupations: Engineer, industrialist, automotive pioneer
- Known for: Daimler Motoren Gesellschaft (Daimler Motors Corporation, DMG)

Gottlieb Wilhelm Daimler (German: [ˈɡɔtliːp ˈdaɪmlɐ]; 17 March 1834 – 6 March 1900) was a German engineer, industrial designer and industrialist. He was a pioneer of internal-combustion engines and automobile development. He invented the high-speed liquid petroleum-fueled engine.

Daimler and his lifelong business partner Wilhelm Maybach were two inventors whose goal was to create small, high-speed engines to be mounted in any kind of locomotion device. In 1883 they designed a horizontal cylinder layout compressed charge liquid petroleum engine that fulfilled Daimler's desire for a high speed engine which could be throttled, making it useful in transportation applications. This engine was called Daimler's Dream.

In 1885 they designed a vertical cylinder version of this engine which they subsequently fitted to a two-wheeler, the first internal combustion motorcycle which was named the Petroleum Reitwagen (Riding Car) and, in the next year, to a coach, and a boat. Daimler called this engine the grandfather clock engine (Standuhr) because of its resemblance to a large pendulum clock.

In 1890, they converted their partnership into a stock company Daimler Motoren Gesellschaft (DMG, in English – the Daimler Motors Corporation). They sold their first automobile in 1892. Daimler fell ill and took a break from the business. Upon his return he experienced difficulty with the other stockholders that led to his resignation in 1893. This was reversed in 1894. Maybach resigned at the same time, and also returned. Daimler died in 1900 and Wilhelm Maybach quit DMG in 1907.

Daimler is seen as "the father of the motorcycle".

== Early life and education (1834–1862) ==
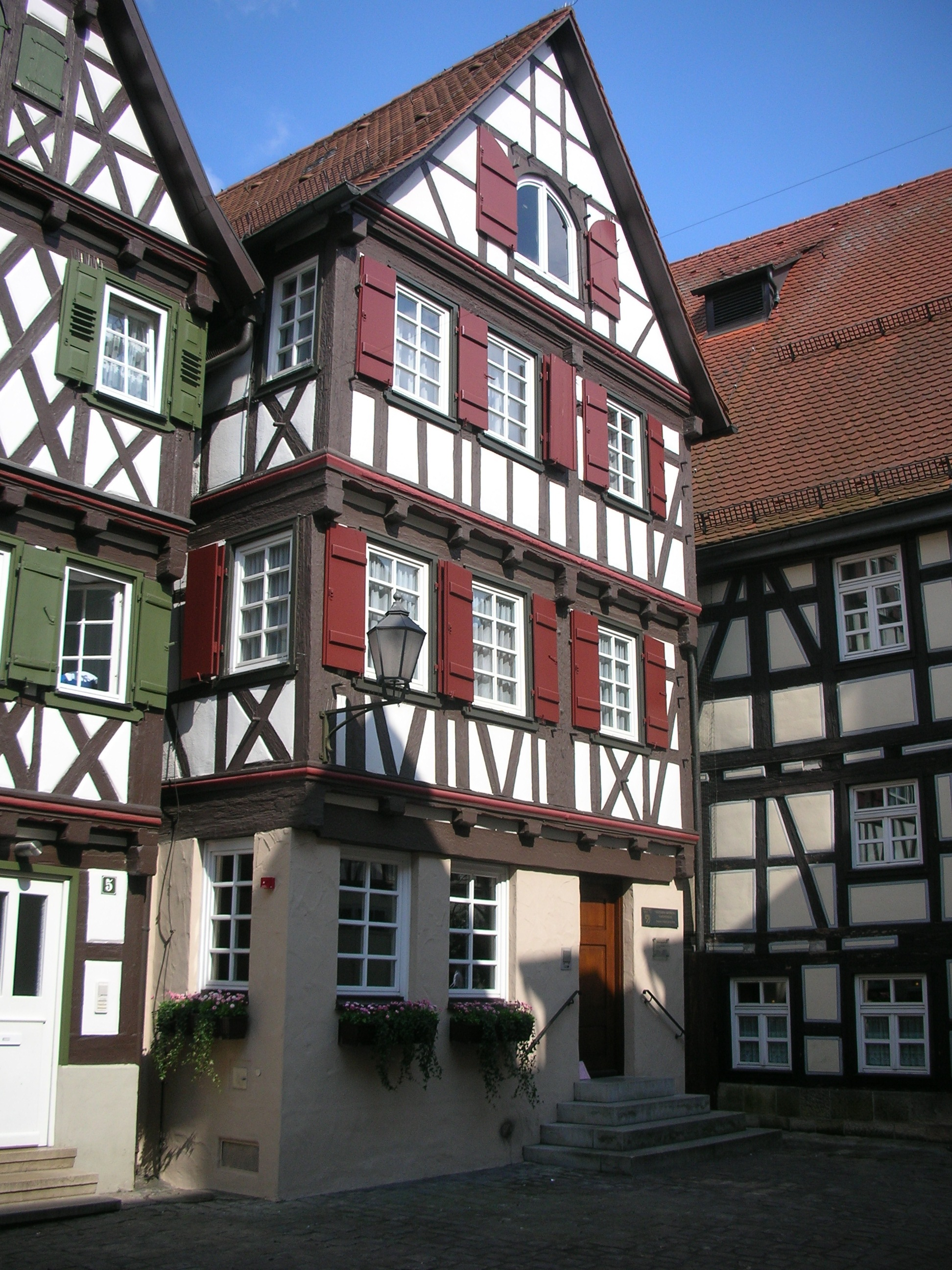
Daimler's birthplace in Schorndorf, now a small museum

Gottlieb Wilhelm Daimler was born on 17 March 1834 in the town of Schorndorf near Stuttgart, Kingdom of Württemberg, a federal state of the German Confederation, in what is now Germany. His parents were Johannes Däumler (Daimler), a baker, and his wife Frederika. By the age of 13 (1847), he had completed six years of primary studies in Lateinschule and became interested in engineering.

After completing secondary school in 1848, Daimler had trained as a gunsmith under Master Gunsmith Hermann Raithel. In 1852 he ended the training with the trade examination. He graduated in 1852, passing the craft test with a pair of engraved double-barreled pistols. The same year, at eighteen, Daimler decided to take up mechanical engineering, abandoning gunsmithing, and left his home town.

Daimler enrolled at Stuttgart's School for Advanced Training in the Industrial Arts, under the tutelage of Ferdinand von Steinbeis. Daimler was studious, even taking extra Sunday morning classes. In 1853, Daimler, with Steinbeis' assistance, got work at "the factory college", Rollé und Schwilque (R&S) in Grafenstaden, so-called because its manager, Friedrich Messmer, had been an instructor at the University of Karlsruhe. Daimler performed well, and when Rollé und Schwilque began making railway locomotives in 1856, Daimler, then 22, was named foreman.

Instead of staying, Daimler took two years at Stuttgart's Polytechnic Institute to hone his skills, gaining in-depth understanding of steam locomotives, as well as "a profound conviction" steam was destined to be superseded. He conceived small, cheap, simple engines for light industrial use, possibly inspired by the newly developed gas engines of that era.

In 1861, he resigned from R&S, visiting Paris, then went on to England, working with the country's top engineering firms, becoming knowledgeable with machine tools. He spent from autumn 1861 to summer 1863 in England, then regarded as "the motherland of technology", at Beyer, Peacock & Company, Manchester, whose partner Beyer was from Saxony. While in London, he visited the 1862 International Exhibition, where one of the exhibits was a steam carriage. These carriages did not evidently inspire him, however, for his wish was to improve machine tools for metal and woodworking machinery.

== Career through 1882 ==
Daimler went to work for Maschinenfabrik Daniel Straub, Geislingen an der Steige, where he designed tools, mills, and turbines. In 1863, he joined the Bruderhaus Reutlingen, a Christian Socialist toolmaker, as inspector and later executive. While there, he met Wilhelm Maybach, then a 15-year-old orphan. Thanks to Daimler's organisational skills, the factory managed to show a profit, but he quit in frustration in 1869, joining Maschinenbau Gesellschaft Karlsruhe in July.

When in 1872 N.A. Otto and Cie reorganized as Gasmotoren-Fabrik Deutz, management picked Daimler as factory manager, bypassing even Otto, and Daimler joined the company in August, bringing in Maybach as chief designer. While Daimler managed to improve production, the weakness in Otto's vertical piston design, coupled to Daimler's stubborn insistence on atmospheric engines, led the company to an impasse. Neither Otto nor Daimler would give way, and when Daimler was offered the choice of founding a Deutz branch in Saint Petersburg or resigning, he resigned to set up shop in Cannstatt (financed by savings and shares in Deutz), where he was shortly joined by Maybach.

== Otto four-stroke engine (1876) ==
In 1872 at age 38, Daimler and Maybach moved to work at the world's largest manufacturer of stationary engines at the time, the Deutz-AG-Gasmotorenfabrik in Cologne. It was half-owned by Nicolaus Otto, who was looking for a new technical director. As directors, both Daimler and Otto focused on gas-engine development while Maybach was chief designer.

In 1876, Otto developed a gaseous fuel, compressed charge four-stroke cycle, (also known as the Otto Cycle) engine after 14 years of effort, a system characterised by four piston strokes (intake, compression, power, and exhaust). Otto intended that his invention would replace the steam engines predominant in those years, even though his engine was still primitive and inefficient.

Otto's engine was patented in 1877, but one of his 25 patents was soon challenged and overturned. Daimler, who wanted to make his own engine, feared Otto's patent would prevent it. Daimler hired an attorney who found that a prior art patent for a four stroke engine had been issued in Paris in 1862 to Beau De Rochas, a French public works engineer.

Meanwhile, serious personal differences arose between Daimler and Otto, reportedly with Otto being jealous of Daimler, because of his university background and knowledge. Daimler wanted to build small engines that could be applied to transportation but Otto had no interest in this. When Otto excluded Daimler from his engine patents there was great animosity between the two. Daimler was fired in 1880, receiving 112,000 Gold marks in Deutz-AG shares in compensation for the patents of both Daimler and Maybach. Maybach resigned later and followed Daimler.

== Independent inventor of small, high speed engines (1882) ==
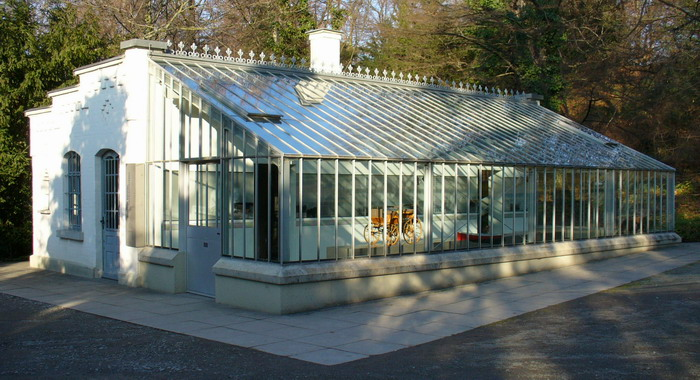
Daimler's summer house (Cannstatt)

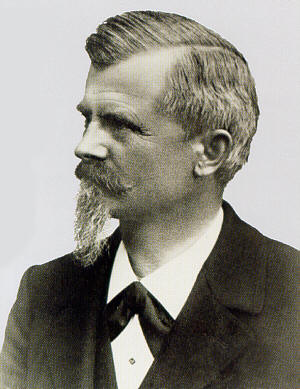
Wilhelm Maybach ca. 1900

At Cannstatt, Daimler and the more creative thinking Maybach devised their engine. At Daimler's insistence, it eliminated "the clumsy, complicated slide-valve ignition", in favor of a hot tube system invented by an Englishman named Watson, since electrical systems functioned too slowly.

In the summer of 1882, Daimler moved to Cannstatt (just outside of Stuttgart at that time), purchasing a cottage in Cannstatt's Taubenheimstrasse, with 75,000 Gold marks from the compensation from Deutz-AG. Maybach followed in September of that year. In the garden, they added a brick extension to the roomy glass-fronted summer house and this became their workshop. Their activities alarmed the neighbors who reported them to the police as suspected counterfeiters. The police obtained a key from the gardener and raided the house in their absence, but found only engines.

Daimler and Maybach spent long hours debating how best to fuel Otto's four-stroke design, and turned to a commonly available petroleum fraction. The main distillates of petroleum at the time were lubricating oil, kerosene (burned as lamp fuel), and ligroin (petroleum naphtha or heavy naphtha), which up to then was used mainly as a cleaner and was sold in pharmacies. "Leichtbenzin [i.e. ligroin and similar petroleum fractions] of a kind common and readily available at pharmacies (chemist's) at the time", as described by antique car expert Michael Plag. "This is a combustible fuel called n-hexane."

== Dream engine (1883) ==
In late 1883, Daimler and Maybach patented the first of their engines fueled by ligroin. This engine was patented on 16 December 1883. It achieved Daimler's goal of being small and running fast enough to be useful at 750 rpm. Improved designs in the next four years brought that up to 900 rpm. Daimler had three engines built to this design early in 1884, and a flywheel was included in one of the engines. This design was smaller and lighter than engines by other inventors of the time. Daimler relied on hot tube ignition, until 1897, when he adopted the electrical ignition designed by Bosch.

== Grandfather clock engine (1885) ==
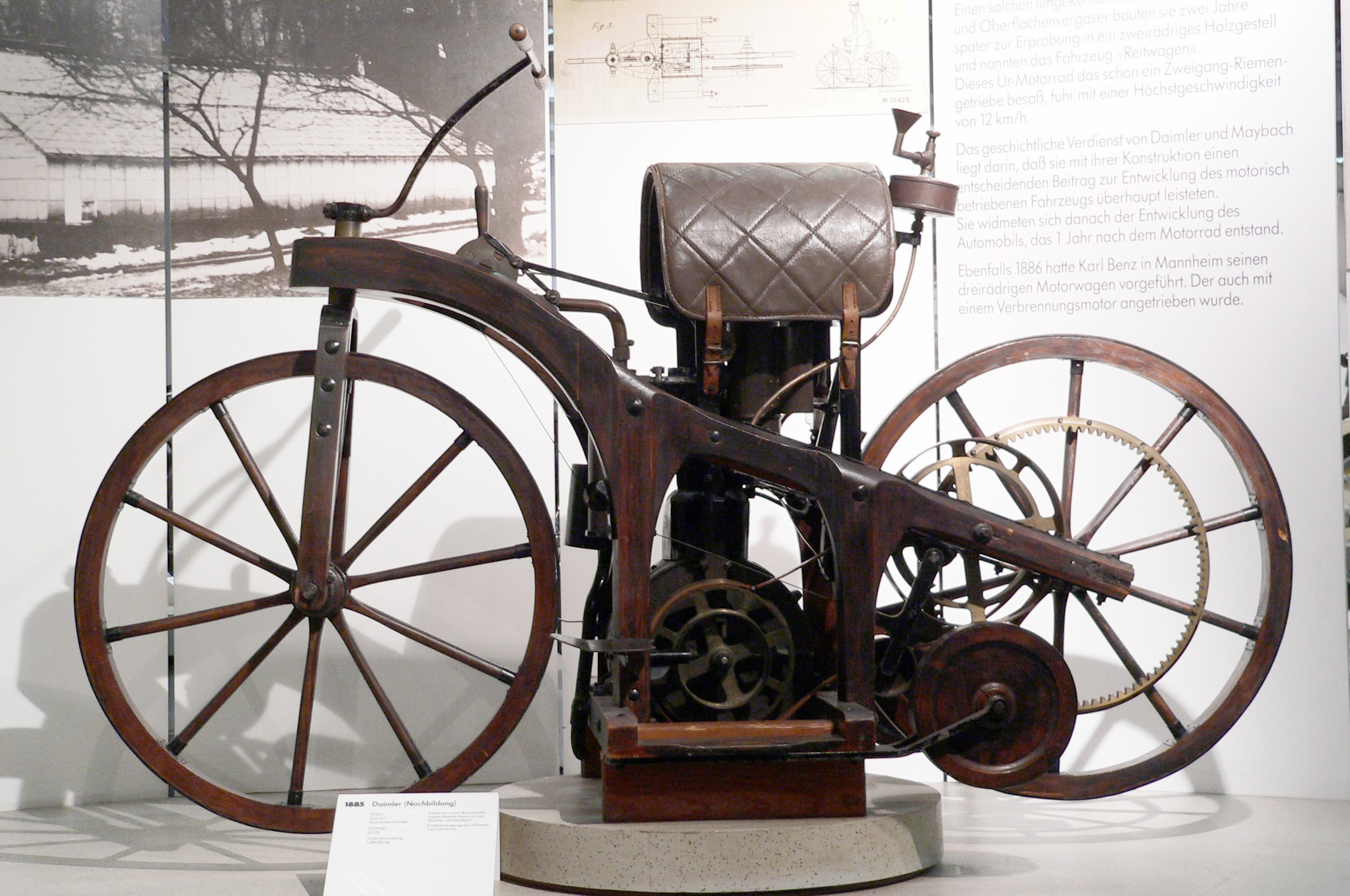
The Reitwagen (riding car), the first internal combustion motorcycle (1885)

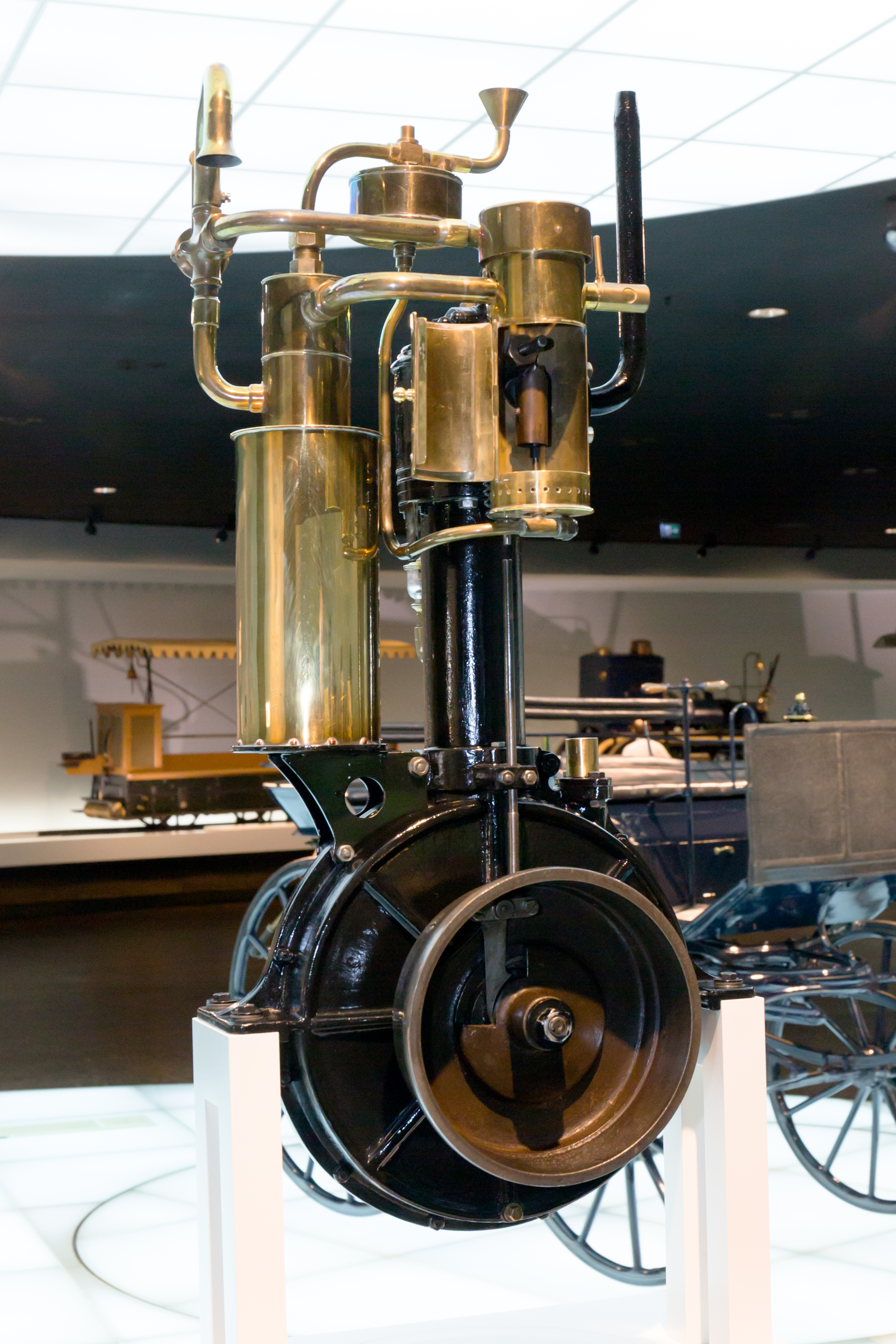
The 1885 Grandfather Clock Engine

The engine with the flywheel included was built into a light vehicle, called the Reitwagen, the first vehicle powered by an internal combustion engine.

It took considerable effort and experimentation, but eventually, the duo perfected a .5 hp (0.37 kW; 0.51 PS) vertical single, which was fitted in the Reitwagen, a purpose-built two-wheeler chassis with two spring-loaded stabilizers.

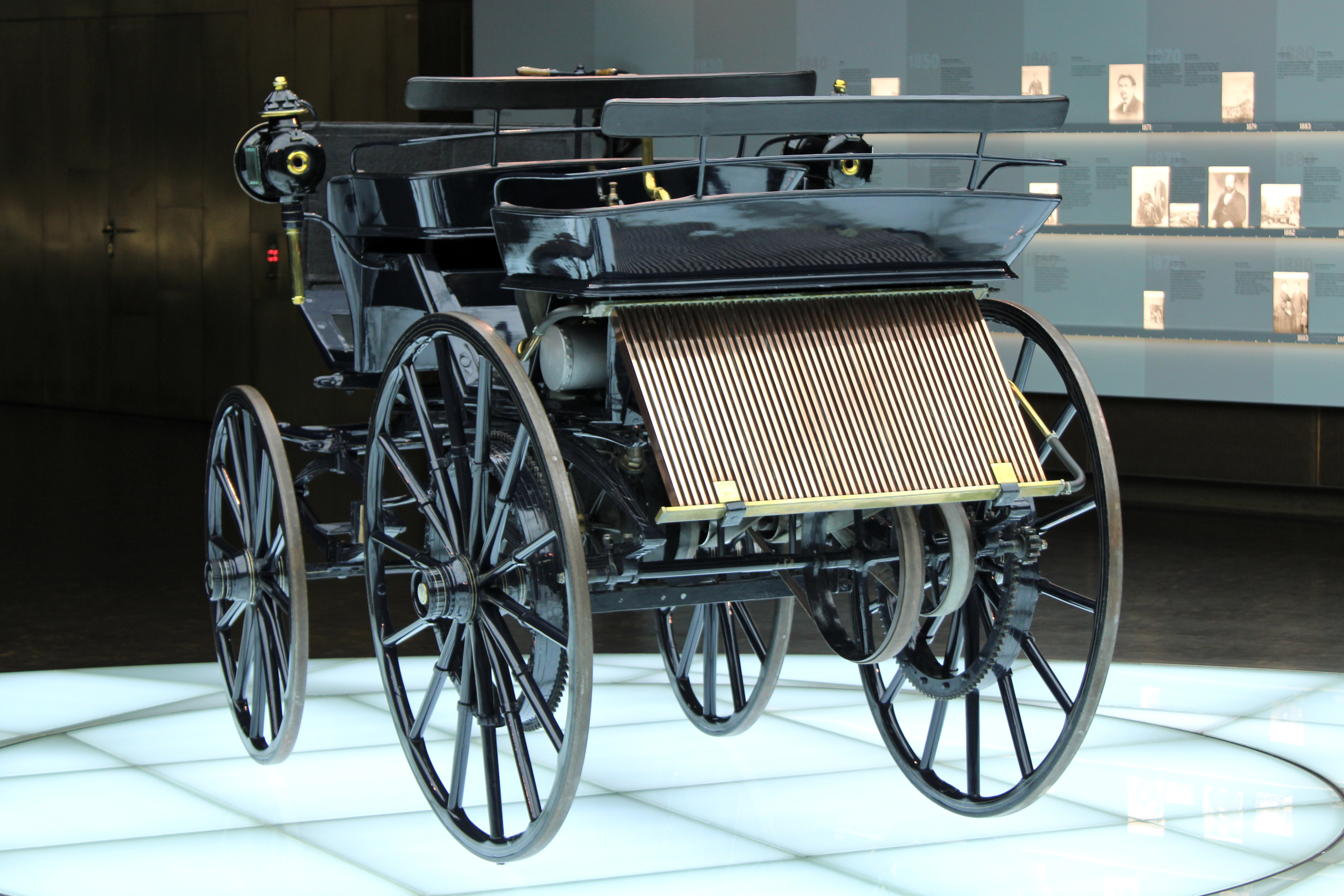
Daimler Motorcoach 1886

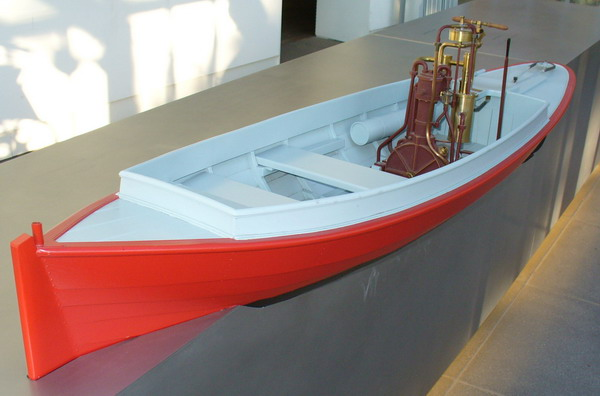
Daimler 1885 Engine in a boat

Features of the 1885 Engine included:

- a single horizontal cylinder of 264 cc, 16 cu in (58 mm × 100 mm, 2.3 in × 3.9 in)
- air cooling
- large cast iron flywheel
- surface carburettor
- hot tube ignition system (patent 28022)
- cam operated exhaust valves, allowing high speed operation
- 0.5 hp (370 W)
- 600 rpm running speed, beating previous engines, which typically ran at about 120 to 180 rpm
- weight of around 50 kg (110 lb)
- height of 76 cm (30 in)

In 1885, they created a carburettor which mixed petrol with air allowing its use as fuel. In the same year Daimler and Maybach assembled a larger version of their engine, still relatively compact, but now with a vertical cylinder of 100 cc displacement and an output of 1 hp at 600 rpm (patent DRP-28-022: "non-cooled, heat insulated engine with unregulated hot-tube ignition"). It was baptised the Standuhr ("grandfather clock"), because Daimler thought it resembled an old pendulum clock.

In November 1885, Daimler installed a smaller version of this engine in a wooden two wheeler frame with two outrigger wheels, creating the first internal combustion motorcycle (Patent 36-423impff & Sohn "Vehicle with gas or petroleum drive machine"). It was named the Reitwagen (riding car). Maybach rode it for three kilometres (two miles) alongside the river Neckar, from Cannstatt to Untertürkheim, reaching 12 kilometres per hour (7 mph).

== First automobile (1886) ==
Independently of each other, Karl Benz and Gottlieb Daimler each produced an automobile in 1886, both in Germany, about 60 miles apart.

About sixty miles away in Mannheim, Karl Benz built an automobile using an integral design for a motorized vehicle with one of his own engines. He was granted a patent for his motorwagen on 29 January 1886.

When this proved the engine capable of driving a vehicle, Daimler devised a 1.1 hp (0.82 kW; 1.1 PS) single and ordered a Wimpff und Söhne four-seater phaeton to house it. Daimler's engine was installed by Maschinenfabrik Esslingen and drove the rear wheels through a dual-ratio belt drive.

On 8 March 1886, Daimler and Maybach secretly brought an American Model coach made by Wilhelm Wimpff and Sohn into the house, telling the neighbors it was a birthday gift for Mrs. Daimler. Maybach supervised the installation of a larger 1.1 hp 462 cc (28 cu in) (70 mm × 120 mm, 2.8 in × 4.7 in) version of the Grandfather Clock engine into this stagecoach and it became the first four-wheeled vehicle to reach 16 kilometres per hour (10 mph). The engine power was transmitted by a set of belts. As with the motorcycle, it was tested on the road to Untertürkheim where nowadays the MHPArena, formerly called the Gottlieb-Daimler-Stadion, is situated.

Driven by Daimler's desire to use the engine as many ways as possible, Daimler and Maybach used the engine in other types of transport including:

- on water (1886), by mounting it in a 4.5 m (15 ft) long boat and achieving a speed of 6 knots (11 km/h; 6.9 mph). The boat was called Neckar after the river where it was tested. (patent DRP 39-367). This was the first motorboat and boat engines soon would become Daimler's main product for several years. The first customers expressed fear the petrol engine could explode, so Daimler hid the engine with a ceramic cover and told them it was "oil-electrical".
- street-cars and trolleys.
- in the air in Daimler's balloon, usually regarded as the first airship, where it replaced a hand-operated engine designed by Dr. Friedrich Hermann Wölfert of Leipzig. With the new engine, Daimler successfully flew over Seelberg on 10 August 1888.

They sold their first foreign licenses for engines in 1887 and Maybach went as their representative to the 1889 Paris Exposition to show their achievements.

== First Daimler-Maybach automobile built (1889) ==
Steel Wheel Automobile 1889
· high speed four-stroke petrol engine
· fuel vaporization
· 2 cylinders V-configured
· mushroom shaped valves
· water-cooled
· 4 speed toothed gearbox
· pioneer axle-pivot steering system

Engine sales increased, mostly for use in boats, and in June 1887, Daimler bought another property at Seelberg hill, Cannstatt. It was located some distance from the town on Ludwigstraße 67 because Cannstatt's mayor did not approve of the workshop. Built at a cost 30,200 goldmarks, the new premises had room for 23 employees. Daimler managed the commercial issues while Maybach ran the engine design department.

In 1889, Daimler and Maybach built the Stahlradwagen, their first automobile that did not involve adapting a horse-drawn carriage with their engine, but which was somewhat influenced by bicycle designs. There was no production in Germany, but it was licensed to be built in France and presented to the public in Paris in October 1889 by both engineers. The same year, Daimler's wife, Emma Kunz, died.

== Daimler Motors, the Phönix engine, and the first motorcar sold (1890 to 1900) ==
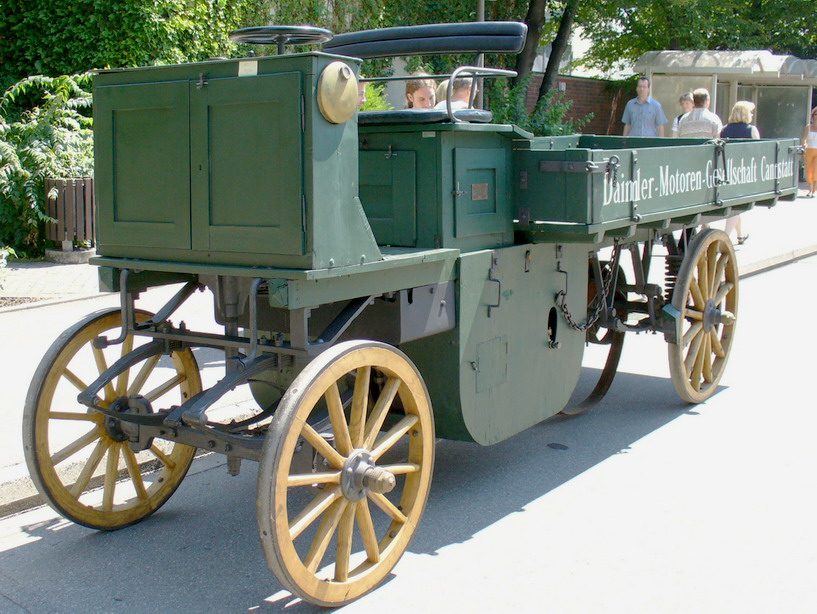
Model of a DMG Lastwagen, 1896, first petrol truck

With demand for engines growing, for uses in everything from motorboats to railcars, Maybach and Daimler expanded. In 1890 Daimler founded his own engine business, Daimler Motoren Gesellschaft (DMG). With funding from gunpowder maker Max Duttenhofer, industrialist, and banker Kilian von Steiner, and munitions manufacturer de:Wilhelm Lorenz, Daimler Motoren Gesellschaft was founded 28 November 1890, with Maybach as chief designer. Its purpose was the construction of small, high-speed engines for use on land, water, and air transport. The three uses were expressed by Daimler in a sketch that became the basis for a logo with a three-pointed star.

From 1882 until 1890, Daimler had resisted making his company into an incorporation or stock company. He had seen what happened to too many engineers who had pioneered a capital invention as he had. Many of them were forced out of their own companies by stock holders who "knew better" about how to run the company that they had just purchased than the man who founded the company. It happened to Henry Ford, Ransom Olds, Karl Benz, and August Horch.

Daimler hated having to incorporate his company. Unable to obtain majority control, he sold out and then resigned. DMG expanded, but it changed. The newcomers, not believing in automobile production, ordered the creation of additional stationary engine building capacity, and considered merging DMG with Otto's Deutz-AG.

In 1892, DMG finally sold its first automobile. DMG developed the high-speed Phönix straight-twin engine, for which Maybach invented a spray carburetor. This was fitted in a singularly ugly car, which entered production in 1895 after a cessation of hostilities between Daimler, Maybach, and the DMG board.

Gottlieb Daimler, aged 58, had heart problems and suffered a collapse in the winter of 1892–1893. His doctor prescribed a trip to Florence, where he met Lina Hartmann, a widow 22 years his junior who was the owner of the hotel where he was staying. They married on 8 July 1893, honeymooning in Chicago during its World Fair.

Returning from the 1893 World's Fair in Chicago with his new wife, Daimler had vowed to purchase enough shares of DMG to regain control. This effort failed. Daimler sold all his shares and patents and resigned from the company. Maybach had left earlier.

The disputes with Lorenz continued. Daimler attempted to buy 102 extra shares to get a majority holding, but was forced out of his post as technical director. The corporation was 400,000 Gold marks in debt. The other directors threatened to declare bankruptcy if Daimler didn't sell them all his shares and all his personal patent rights from the previous thirty years. Daimler accepted the offer, receiving 66,666 Gold Marks, and resigned in 1893.

In 1894 at the Hermann Hotel, Maybach together with Daimler and his son Paul designed a third engine called the "Phoenix" and had DMG make it. It featured:

- four cylinders cast in one block arranged vertically and parallel
- camshaft operated exhaust valves
- a spray nozzle carburetor, patented by Maybach in 1893
- an improved belt drive system

This is probably the same internal-combustion engine referred to by the American author and historian Henry Brooks Adams, who describes the "Daimler motor" and its great speed from his visit to the 1900 Paris Exposition in his autobiography.

Daimler and Maybach continued to work together. They built a four-cylinder engine with Maybach' spray nozzle carburetor. It was in the first organized automobile race, the "Paris to Rouen" and defeated all the entries from DMG. Frederick Simms, German-born long-time friend of Gottlieb Daimler insisted that Daimler be brought back into the company making it a condition of his payment of £17,500 for the transfer of his Daimler licenses to the British Daimler Company which would stabilize the corporation's finances, that Daimler, now aged sixty, should return to DMG. Gottlieb Daimler received 200,000 goldmarks in shares, plus a 100,000 bonus. Simms received the right to use the name "Daimler" as his brand name for Daimler Company products. In 1895, the year DMG assembled its 1,000th engine, Maybach returned as General Inspector, receiving 30,000 shares.

During this period, they agreed to licenses to build Daimler engines around the world, which included:

- France, from 1890, under a licence held by Louise Sarazin: Panhard et Levassor and Peugeot,
- the United States, from 1891, under Daimler Motor Company of Long Island City in a partnership with American and German piano maker Steinway & Sons
- the United Kingdom, from 1893, by Frederick Simms' Daimler Motor Syndicate transferred in 1896 to the Daimler Motor Company
- Austria, by Austro-Daimler

Daimler died in 1900, and in 1907 Maybach resigned from DMG.

== Founding of Daimler-Benz ==
Daimler developed the first liquid petroleum vehicle in 1885, and Karl Benz developed the first purpose-built automobile using a two-stroke engine of his own design a few months later. Daimler never met Karl Benz during the period of invention. In 1896, Daimler (DMG) sued Benz & Cie for violating his 1883 patent on hot tube ignition. Daimler won, and Benz had to pay royalties to DMG. Daimler did not meet Karl Benz while they were in court in Mannheim. Later, at the founding of the Central European Motor Car Association, Daimler and Benz still did not speak to each other.

Years after Daimler died, the two companies did cooperate in many ways. After many years of cooperation, on 28 June 1926 representatives of Daimler-Motoren-Gesellschaft (DMG) and Benz & Cie signed the agreement for the merger of the two oldest automobile manufacturers in the world. The resulting new company was named Daimler-Benz AG.

== Honours ==
Gottlieb Daimler was accepted into the Automotive Hall of Fame in 1978. Between 1993 and July 2008, Daimler had a stadium named after him in Stuttgart, Germany. The former Gottlieb-Daimler-Stadion was the venue for six matches in the 2006 FIFA World Cup in Germany.

Gottlieb Daimler's motto was Das Beste oder nichts ("The best or nothing at all"; "Nothing but the best"). Mercedes-Benz adopted this motto as their slogan in 2010.

== See also ==
- Nicolas Léonard Sadi Carnot, physics of the internal combustion engine
- Illuminating gas, first internal combustion engine fuel
- Ligroin or heavy naphtha, first liquid automotive fuel, n-hexane
- List of German inventors and discoverers

Car and car engine designers, chronologically by first vehicle/engine built

- Nicolas-Joseph Cugnot (1725–1804), French inventor of the world's first automobile, a 1769–1770 steam-fuelled vehicle
- Étienne Lenoir (1822–1900), developer of the first atmospheric gaseous fueled internal combustion engine and automobile (1860–1863), pioneer of electroplating
- Nicolaus Otto (1832–1891), developer of the first successful compressed charge gaseous fueled internal combustion engine (1860s–70s)
- Siegfried Marcus (1831–1898), developed petrol-powered, internal combustion engine vehicles (1864? 1870? 1888)
- Wilhelm Maybach (1846–1929), designed engines starting in the 1870s–80s; first motorbike (1885), second internal combustion car (1889)

== Sources ==
- Kirchberg, Peter; Wächtler, Eberhard (1981). Carl Benz Gottlieb Daimler Wilhelm Maybach. Biographien hevorragender Naturwissenschaftler, Techniker und Mediziner series, Vol. 52 (in German) (2nd ed.). Wiesbaden: Vieweg Verlag. ISBN 978-3322822185.
- Niemann, Harry: Gottlieb Daimler. Fabriken, Banken und Motoren. Delius Klasing, Bielefeld 2000, ISBN 3-7688-1210-3.
- Schildberger, Friedrich (1957). "Daimler, Gottlieb Wilhelm". Neue Deutsche Biographie (in German). Vol. 3. Berlin: Duncker & Humblot. pp. 485–487. (full text online).
- Seherr-Thoss, Hans-Christoph von, ed. Zwei Männer, ein Stern: Gottlieb Daimler und Karl Benz in Bildern, Daten, Dokumenten. VDI-Verlag, Düsseldorf 1989, ISBN 3-18-400851-7.
- Siebertz, Paul. Gottlieb Daimler: Ein Revolutionär der Technik. 4th ed., Stuttgart: Reclam Verlag, 1950.
- Völker, Renate; Völker, Karl-Otto: Gottlieb Daimler: Ein bewegtes Leben. Silberburg-Verlag, Tübingen and Baden-Baden, 2013, ISBN 978-3-8425-1230-6.
- Wise, David Burgess. "Daimler: Founder of the Four-Wheeler", in Northey, Tom, ed. World of Automobiles Vol. 5, pp. 481–483. London: Orbis, 1974.
