= Classic Bike =

UK motorcycle magazine

- Editor: Mike Armitage
- Categories: Motorcycles
- Frequency: Monthly
- Circulation: 351,000 (TGI October 2006 - September 2007).
- Publisher: Bauer Consumer Media Ltd
- Founded: 1978
- Company: Bauer Publishing Group
- Country: United Kingdom
- Based in: Peterborough
- Language: English
- Website: www.classicbike.co.uk
- ISSN: 0142-890X

Classic Bike is a UK motorcycle magazine. Launched in 1978, it is noted for coverage of all makes of classic motorcycles, including US and Japanese models, and one-off specials. Classic Bike was founded in 1978 as a quarterly magazine, and has the world's largest circulation for a classic motorcycle magazine.

== Editors ==
Previous editors have included Mike Nicks, John Pearson, Phillip Tooth, Brian Crichton, Gary Pinchin and Hugo Wilson. The current (2023) editor is once again Hugo Wilson. Under the banner "real bikes for blokes with spanners" it has an emphasis on practical hands-on motorcycling.

== Features ==
As well as special features on classic motorcycles, famous motorcyclists and readers bikes, the magazine has regular features that include:

- Classic World - news, reviews and events in the classic bike market place
- Our Classics - Updates on the classic bikes owned by the editorial team
- Classic America - Mark Gardiner on the US classic bike scene
- Rics Fixes - Rick Parkington explaining how to keep classic bikes running
