= David Burgess-Wise =

British motoring journalist

David Burgess-Wise is a motoring author, enthusiast, and automobile historian.

According to the dustcover of the book "The Illustrated Encyclopedia of Automobiles" he edited in 1979, David Burgess Wise [with no "-"] was born in 1942.

A motoring writer since 1960, Burgess-Wise has written 25 books on motoring history. He also edits the award-winning Aston, journal of the Aston Martin Heritage Trust.

== See also ==
- Electric Motive Power
