= List of motorcycles in The Art of the Motorcycle exhibition =

The Art of the Motorcycle was an exhibition held at the Solomon R. Guggenheim Museum in New York City from June 26 to September 20, 1998. The exhibition's official catalog listed 95 motorcycles, plus some pre-20th century exhibits were included, bringing the total to 114. The exhibition was subsequently displayed at the Guggenheim Museum Bilbao in Bilbao, Spain from November 24, 1999, to September 3, 2000. It was also the inaugural exhibition at the Guggenheim Las Vegas, located in The Venetian Resort in Las Vegas, which opened on October 7, 2001.

In the 1998 New York exhibition, there were pre-20th Century models listed separately from the main catalog. There are four examples which date earlier than the first exhibit in the catalog proper, the 1894 Hildebrand & Wolfmüller; even though it, too, is pre-20th Century, it was chosen to lead the exhibit because it is the first series production motorcycle.

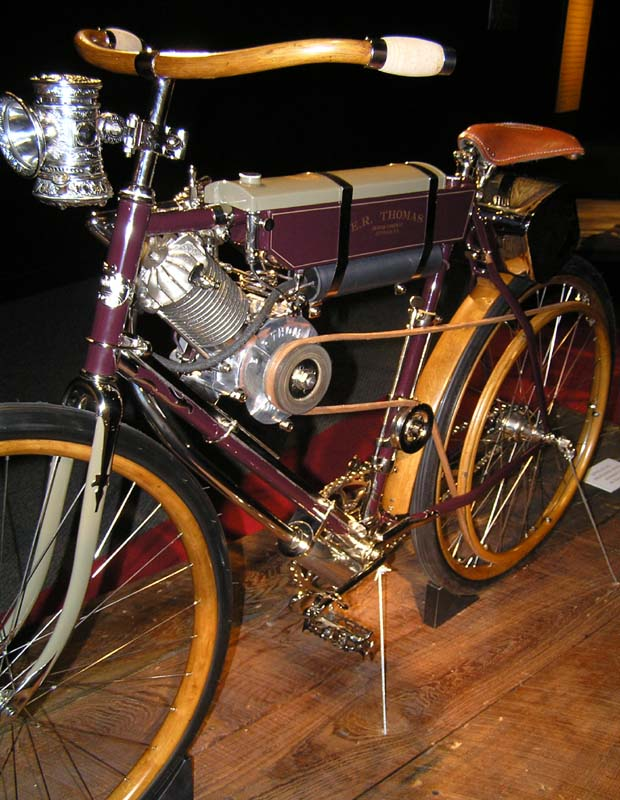
1901 Thomas (Memphis exhibition). 1.8 hp, top speed 25 mph.

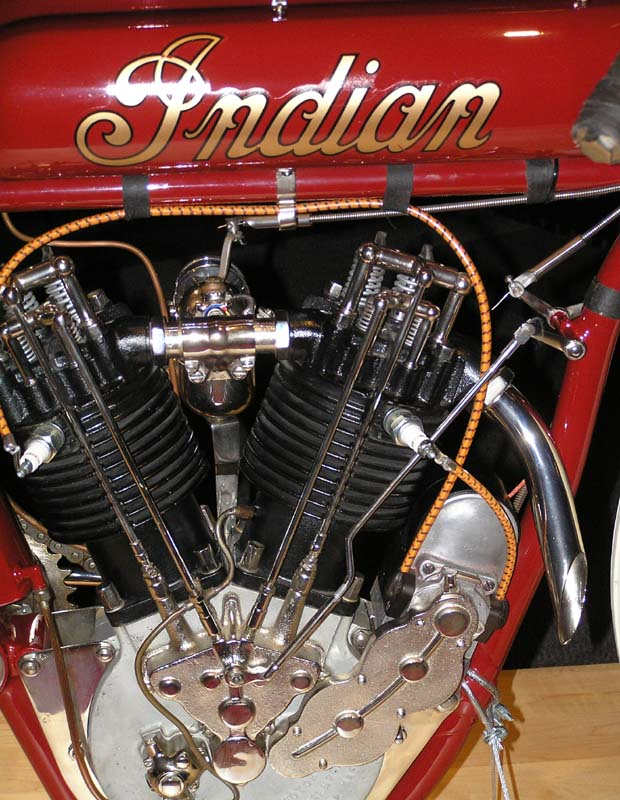
1915 Indian 8-valve board track racer - The Art of the Motorcycle - Memphis. Bore x stroke 3-1/4 x 3-43/64 in. 61 cu-in. Power unknown. Top speed: 132 mph (212 km/h). Collection of Daniel K. Statenkov.

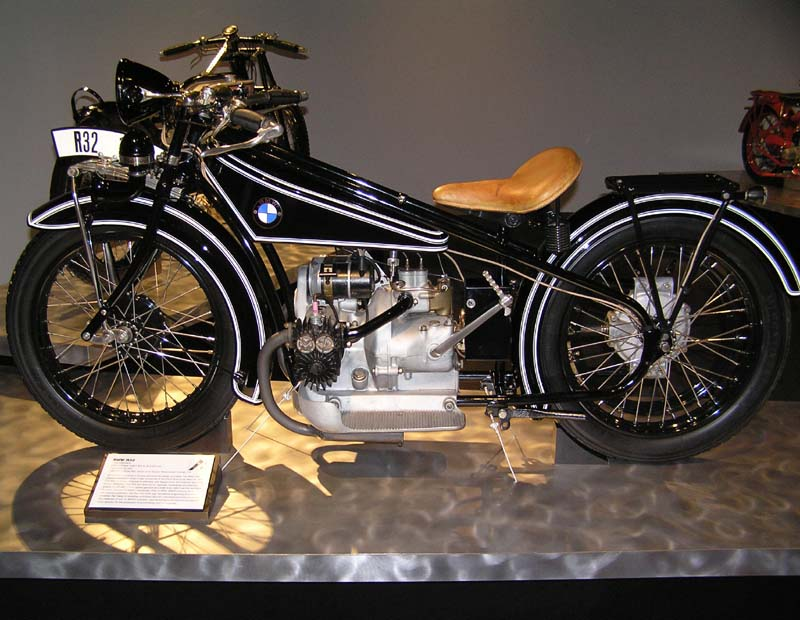
1923 BMW R32 - The Art of the Motorcycle - Memphis. 494 cc, bore x stroke: 68 x 68 mm. Power: 8.5 hp @ 3,200 rpm. Top speed: 62 mph (100 km/h). Collection of David Percival.

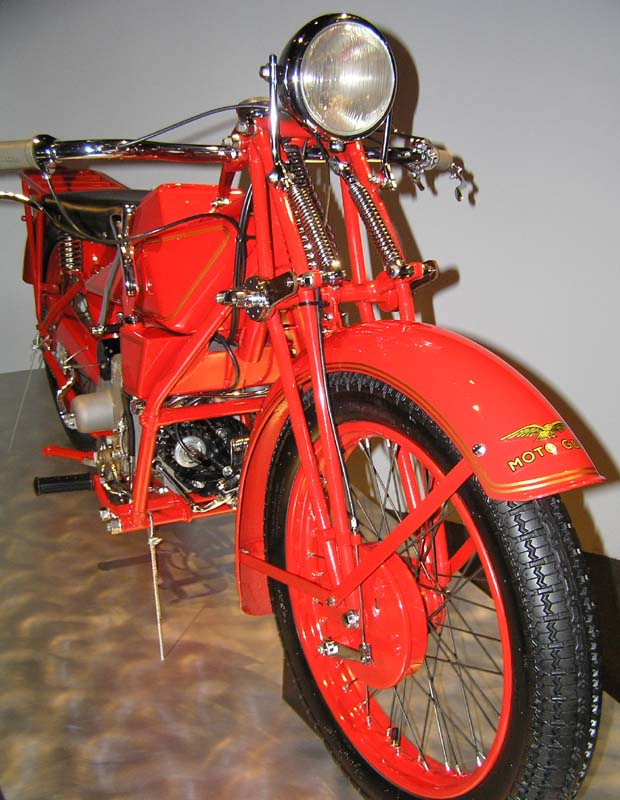
1924 Moto Guzzi C4V - The Art of the Motorcycle - Memphis. 498 cc, bore x stroke 88 x 82 mm. Power: 22 hp @ 5,500 rpm. Top speed: 93 mph (150 km/h). Moto Guzzi SpA, Mandello del Lario, Italy.

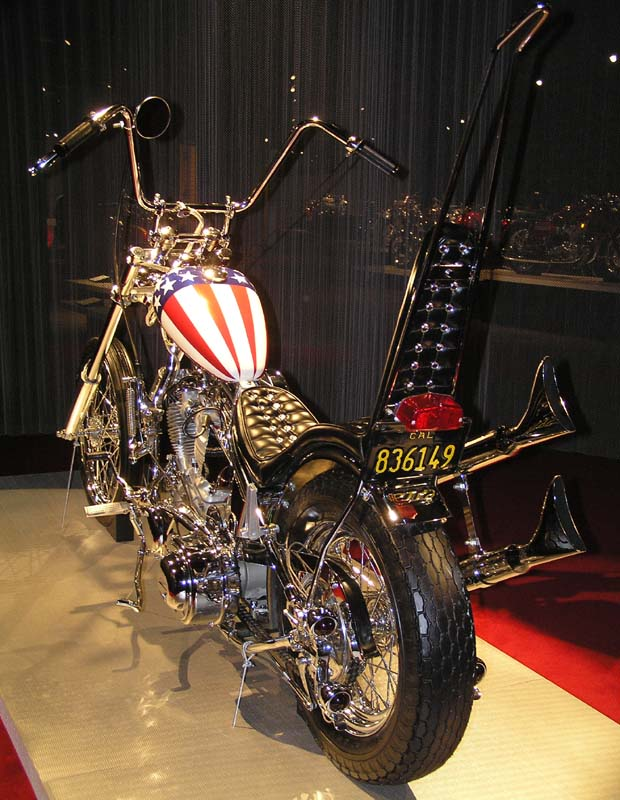
A 1993 replica of the "Captain America bike" 1969 Harley-Davidson Easy Rider chopper. The Art of the Motorcycle - Memphis. Bore x stroke 87.1 x 100.6 mm. 1200 cc. Power: 61 hp @ 6,000 rpm. Top speed: 100 mph (161 km/h). The Otis Chandler Vintage Museum of Transportation and Wildlife, Oxnard, California.

Make and model	Engine displacement	Year	Country	New York	Las Vegas
Michaux-Perreaux steam velocipede	N/A	1868–71	France	✓	✓
Copeland steam bicycle	N/A	1884	United States		✓
Daimler Einspur (aka Reitwagen)	264 cc (16.1 cu in)	1885 (replica)	Germany	✓	✓
Roper steam velocipede	N/A	1894	United States		✓
Hildebrand & Wolfmüller	1,489 cc (90.9 cu in)	1894	Germany	✓	✓
Geneva steam bicycle	n/a	1896	United States	✓	✓
De Dion-Bouton tricycle	240 cc (15 cu in)	1899	France	✓	
De Dion-Bouton tricycle	240 cc (15 cu in)	1900	France		✓
Orient tricycle	20 cc (1.2 cu in)	1900	United States	✓	
Thomas Auto-Bi	n/a	1900	United States	✓	✓
Motosachoche A1	214 cc (13.1 cu in)	1901	Switzerland		✓
Indian Single	16 cu in (260 cc)	1901–02	United States	✓	✓
Werner motorcycle	333 cc (20.3 cu in)	1903–04	France		✓
Curtiss Twin	61 cu in (1,000 cc)	1906	United States		✓
Curtiss V-8	265 cu in (4,340 cc)	1907	United States	✓	
FN Four	498 cc (30.4 cu in)	1908	Belgium	✓	✓
Pierce Four	43 cu in (700 cc)	1910	United States	✓	✓
Flying Merkel Model V	54 cu in (880 cc)	1911	United States	✓	✓
Harley-Davidson Model 7D	49 cu in (800 cc)	1911	United States	✓	✓
Motosacoche 2C6TT	343 cc (20.9 cu in)	1913	Switzerland		✓
Peugeot Paris-Nice 500	498 cc (30.4 cu in)	1913	France		✓
Cyclone	61 cu in (1,000 cc)	1914	United States	✓	✓
Peugeot Paris-Nice	345 cc (21.1 cu in)	1914	France	✓	
Indian 8-valve board track racer	61 cu in (1,000 cc)	1915	United States	✓	✓
Iver Johnson Model 15-7	62 cu in (1,020 cc)	1915	United States	✓	✓
Harley-Davidson Model W Sport Twin	36 cu in (590 cc)	1919	United States	✓	✓
Indian Model O	16 cu in (260 cc)	1918	United States		✓
Mars Weiss A20	948 cc (57.9 cu in)	1921	Germany		✓
Megola Sport	640 cc (39 cu in)	1922	Germany	✓	✓
Monet & Goyon Moto Légére	117 cc (7.1 cu in)	1922	France	✓	
Ner-a-Car	14 cu in (230 cc)	1922	United States	✓	
BMW R32	494 cc (30.1 cu in)	1923	Germany	✓	✓
Harley-Davidson 8-valve board track racer	61 cu in (1,000 cc)	1923	United States	✓	✓
Moto Guzzi C4V	498 cc (30.4 cu in)	1924	Italy	✓	✓
Böhmerland	598 cc (36.5 cu in)	1925	Czechoslovakia	✓	✓
Neracar Model B	17 cu in (280 cc)	1925	United States/United Kingdom		✓
Brough Superior SS100 Alpine Grand Sport	988 cc (60.3 cu in)	1926	United Kingdom	✓	
Bianchi B2N Sport	350 cc (21 cu in)	1927	Italy		✓
Moto Guzzi 4VSS	498 cc (30.4 cu in)	1928	Italy		✓
Scott Squirrel Sprint Special	620 cc (38 cu in)	1929	United Kingdom	✓	✓
Opel Motoclub SS500	495 cc (30.2 cu in)	1929	Germany		✓
Brough Superior SS100	988 cc (60.3 cu in)	1930	United Kingdom		✓
Schwinn Excelsior Super X	45 cu in (740 cc)	1930	United States		✓
Majestic 350	349 cc (21.3 cu in)	1930	France	✓	✓
Ariel Square Four	497 cc (30.3 cu in)	1931	United Kingdom	✓	✓
MGC N3BR	245 cc (15.0 cu in)	1932	France	✓	✓
Dollar V4	748 cc (45.6 cu in)	1933	France	✓	✓
Gnome et Rhône M1	306 cc (18.7 cu in)	1934	France	✓	
Harley-Davidson Model E	61 cu in (1,000 cc)	1936	United States		✓
BMW world land-speed record	493 cc (30.1 cu in)	1937	Germany	✓	✓
Crocker	61 cu in (1,000 cc)	1938	United States		✓
Gnome et Rhône 750X	723 cc (44.1 cu in)	1938	France		✓
Triumph Speed Twin	498 cc (30.4 cu in)	1938	United Kingdom	✓	
Triumph Speed Twin	498 cc (30.4 cu in)	1937	United Kingdom		✓
Crocker	61 cu in (1,000 cc)	1940	United States	✓	
Indian Sport Scout "bob-job"	57 cu in (930 cc)	1940	United States	✓	✓
DKW RT 125 W	122 cc (7.4 cu in)	1941	Germany		✓
Zündapp KS600	597 cc (36.4 cu in)	1941	Germany	✓	✓
Harley-Davidson U.S Military Navy Model U	74 cu in (1,210 cc)	1943	United States		✓
Harley-Davidson U.S Military Model U	74 cu in (1,210 cc)	1944	United States	✓	
Gilera Saturno	499 cc (30.5 cu in)	1947	Italy	✓	
Sunbeam S7	487 cc (29.7 cu in)	1947	United Kingdom	✓	
Indian Chief	1,206 cc (73.6 cu in)	1948	United States	✓	✓
Solex Vélosolex	45 cc (2.7 cu in)	1948	France	✓	
Imme R100	99 cc (6.0 cu in)	1949	West Germany	✓	✓
Jackson-Rotrax JAP Speedway	490 cc (30 cu in)	1949	United Kingdom	✓	
Sunbeam S7 Deluxe	500 cc (31 cu in)	1950	United Kingdom		✓
Adler MB 200	195 cc (11.9 cu in)	1952	Germany		✓
DKW RT 125 W	122 cc (7.4 cu in)	1952	West Germany	✓	
Gilera Saterno Sport	499 cc (30.5 cu in)	1952	Italy		✓
Jackson-Rotrax JAP Speedway	497 cc (30.3 cu in)	1952	United Kingdom		✓
Solex Vélosolex	45 cc (2.7 cu in)	1952	France		✓
AJS E-95	499 cc (30.5 cu in)	1953	United Kingdom	✓	
Vincent Black Shadow Series C	998 cc (60.9 cu in)	1953	United Kingdom		✓
Vincent Black Shadow Series C	998 cc (60.9 cu in)	1954	United Kingdom	✓	
MV Agusta 500 Grand Prix	497 cc (30.3 cu in)	1956	Italy	✓	
Aermacchi Chimera	175 cc (10.7 cu in)	1957	Italy		✓
Derny Taon	124 cc (7.6 cu in)	1957	France	✓	✓
Harley-Davidson KR	750 cc (46 cu in)	1957	United States	✓	
Harley-Davidson Sportster XL	883 cc (53.9 cu in)	1957	United States	✓	✓
Norton Manx	498 cc (30.4 cu in)	1958	United Kingdom		✓
NSU Supermax	247 cc (15.1 cu in)	1958	West Germany		✓
Triumph Twenty One	350 cc (21 cu in)	1958	United Kingdom	✓	✓
Matchless G50	496 cc (30.3 cu in)	1959	United Kingdom		✓
Triumph T120 Bonneville	650 cc (40 cu in)	1959	United Kingdom		✓
BSA Gold Star Clubmans	498 cc (30.4 cu in)	1960	United Kingdom	✓	
Honda CB92 Benly Super Sport	125 cc (7.6 cu in)	1960	Japan	✓	
Vespa GS	125 cc (7.6 cu in)	1960	Italy		✓
BSA Gold Star Clubmans	499 cc (30.5 cu in)	1961	United Kingdom		✓
Honda CB92 Benly Super Sport	125 cc (7.6 cu in)	1961	Japan		✓
NSU Supermax	247 cc (15.1 cu in)	1961	West Germany	✓	
Velocette Thruxton	499 cc (30.5 cu in)	1961	United Kingdom		✓
Ducati Elite	204 cc (12.4 cu in)	1962	Italy	✓	✓
Honda CR110	50 cc (3.1 cu in)	1962	Japan	✓	✓
Matchless G50	496 cc (30.3 cu in)	1962	United Kingdom	✓	
Norton Manx	498 cc (30.4 cu in)	1962	United Kingdom	✓	
Parilla GS	247 cc (15.1 cu in)	1962	Italy	✓	✓
Vespa GS	146 cc (8.9 cu in)	1962	Italy	✓	
Harley-Davidson KR	750 cc (46 cu in)	1963	United States		✓
Honda C100 Super Cub	49 cc (3.0 cu in)	1963	Japan	✓	✓
Velocette Venom	499 cc (30.5 cu in)	1963	United Kingdom	✓	
Matchless G80CS	497 cc (30.3 cu in)	1964	United Kingdom		✓
Bultaco Sherpa T	244 cc (14.9 cu in)	1965	Spain	✓	✓
Harley-Davidson FLH Electra Glide	1,198 cc (73.1 cu in)	1965	United States		✓
Kreidler Florett	49 cc (3.0 cu in)	1965	West Germany	✓	✓
Bultaco Metrella 62	196 cc (12.0 cu in)	1966	Spain		✓
Honda RC174	297 cc (18.1 cu in)	1967	Japan		✓
Suzuki T20 "Super Six"	247 cc (15.1 cu in)	1967	Japan		✓
Triumph Bonneville T120	650 cc (40 cu in)	1967	United Kingdom	✓	
MV Agusta 500 Grand Prix	497 cc (30.3 cu in)	1968	Italy		✓
BSA Rocket 3	740 cc (45 cu in)	1969	United Kingdom	✓	✓
Harley-Davidson "Captain America" chopper	1,200 cc (73 cu in)	1968 (1993 replica)	United States	✓	✓
Kawasaki H-1	498 cc (30.4 cu in)	1969	Japan		✓
Kawasaki Mach III	498 cc (30.4 cu in)	1969	Japan	✓	
Norton Commando 750 Fastback	745 cc (45.5 cu in)	1969	United Kingdom	✓	
Derbi 50 Grand Prix	49 cc (3.0 cu in)	1970	Spain	✓	✓
Honda CB750 Four	736 cc (44.9 cu in)	1970	Japan	✓	✓
Egli Vincent	1,270 cc (78 cu in)	1971	Switzerland/United Kingdom		✓
Harley-Davidson Super Glide "Night Train"	1,200 cc (73 cu in)	1971	United States	✓	✓
Norton Commando 750 Fastback	745 cc (45.5 cu in)	1971	United Kingdom		✓
Harley-Davidson XR-750	750 cc (46 cu in)	1972	United States	✓	
Honda Elsinore CR250	248 cc (15.1 cu in)	1973	Japan		✓
MV Agusta 750S	743 cc (45.3 cu in)	1973	Italy	✓	✓
Penton Jackpiner	175 cc (10.7 cu in)	1973	United States		✓
Triumph X-75 Hurricane	750 cc (46 cu in)	1973	United Kingdom	✓	✓
Yamaha RD350	347 cc (21.2 cu in)	1973	Japan		✓
Ducati 750SS	748 cc (45.6 cu in)	1974	Italy	✓	✓
Laverda 750SFC	744 cc (45.4 cu in)	1974	Italy	✓	✓
Honda GL1000 Gold Wing	999 cc (61.0 cu in)	1975	Japan	✓	
Morini 3½ Sport	344 cc (21.0 cu in)	1975	Italy		✓
BMW R90S	898 cc (54.8 cu in)	1976	West Germany		✓
Honda GL1000 Gold Wing	999 cc (61.0 cu in)	1976	Japan		✓
Harley-Davidson XLCR	1,000 cc (61 cu in)	1977	United States	✓	✓
Moto Guzzi Le Mans 1	844 cc (51.5 cu in)	1978	Italy	✓	✓
Harley-Davidson XR-750	750 cc (46 cu in)	1980	United States		✓
Suzuki Katana	997 cc (60.8 cu in)	1982	Japan	✓	✓
Honda VF750F "Interceptor"	748 cc (45.6 cu in)	1983	Japan	✓	✓
Benelli Sei	906 cc (55.3 cu in)	1984	Italy	✓	✓
Kawasaki GPZ900R Ninja	908 cc (55.4 cu in)	1984	Japan	✓	✓
BMW K100RS	987 cc (60.2 cu in)	1985	West Germany	✓	✓
BMW R80 G/S Paris-Dakar	980 cc (60 cu in)	1985	West Germany	✓	✓
Suzuki GSX-R750	749 cc (45.7 cu in)	1986	Japan		✓
Buell RS1200	1,203 cc (73.4 cu in)	1989	United States	✓	
Yamaha VMax	1,198 cc (73.1 cu in)	1989	Japan	✓	✓
Buell RS1200	1,203 cc (73.4 cu in)	1990	United States		✓
Bimota Tesi ID ES	904 cc (55.2 cu in)	1992	Italy		✓
Ducati M900 Monster	904 cc (55.2 cu in)	1993	Italy	✓	✓
Yamaha GTS1000	1,003 cc (61.2 cu in)	1993	Japan	✓	✓
Britten V1000	965 cc (58.9 cu in)	1994	New Zealand	✓	✓
Ducati 916	916 cc (55.9 cu in)	1994	Italy	✓	✓
Aprilia Moto 6.5	649 cc (39.6 cu in)	1995	Italy	✓	✓
Honda EXP-2	402 cc (24.5 cu in)	1995	Japan	✓	
Arlen Ness Luxury Liner	1,300 cc (79 cu in)	1996	United States		✓
BMW R1200C	1,170 cc (71 cu in)	1997	Germany	✓	✓
Beta Techno	272 cc (16.6 cu in)	1997	Italy	✓	
Morbidelli V8	847 cc (51.7 cu in)	1997	Italy	✓	✓
Italjet Formula 50 LC	49 cc (3.0 cu in)	1998	Italy	✓	✓
MV Agusta F4	750 cc (46 cu in)	1998	Italy	✓	✓
Suzuki Hayabusa	1,299 cc (79.3 cu in)	1998	Japan		✓
Cobra Trakker	1,450 cc (88 cu in)	2000	United States		✓
Montessa Honda 315RY	249 cc (15.2 cu in)	2001	Spain		✓

== See also ==
- List of motorcycles by type of engine
- List of motorcycles of the 1920s
- List of motorcycles of the 1910s
