= Orient tricycle =

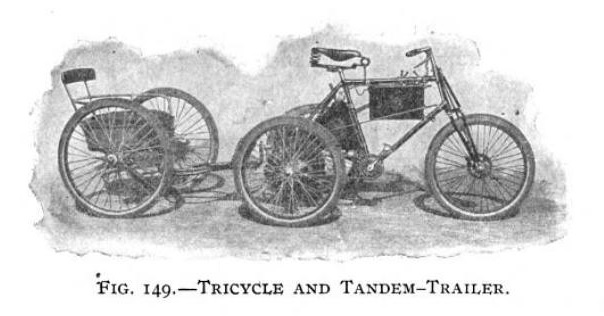
- Orient tricycle with a trailer
- Manufacturer: Waltham Manufacturing Company
- Production: 1899–c. 1901
- Class: Motorized tricycle
- Engine: 20 cu in (330 cm^{3}) water-cooled de Dion-Bouton gasoline or naptha fuel single
- Bore / stroke: 2 15/16 in × 3 in (75 mm × 76 mm)
- Top speed: 50 mph (80 km/h)
- Power: 2.75 hp (2.05 kW)
- Related: De Dion-Bouton tricycle

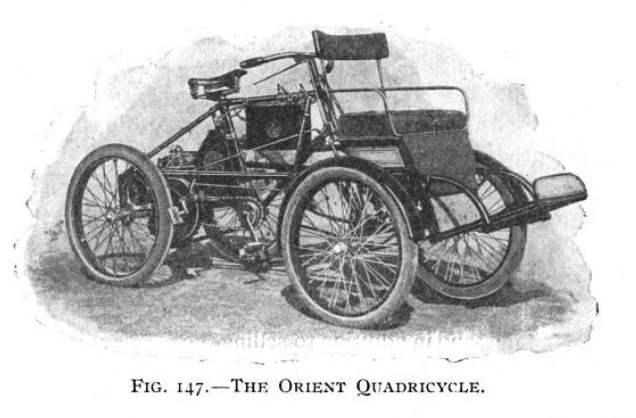
Orient converted to quad configuration

The Orient tricycle was an early motorized tricycle (classified as a motorcycle under some definitions). It was manufactured by Charles H. Metz's Waltham Manufacturing Company in Waltham, Massachusetts and advertised in 1899 as a "motor cycle", the first use of the term in a published catalog.

Orient advertised that the single-person tricycle could be converted to a two-person four wheeled "autogo" in five minutes. A 1900 Orient appeared in The Art of the Motorcycle exhibition at Guggenheim Museum in New York.

== Specifications ==
Specifications in infobox to the right are from Garson, and from Krens.

== Notes and references ==
=== References ===
- Garson, G.P. (January 12, 2011), Motorcycle History: Part 1, Milestones: the genesis of the motorcycle, Motorcycle.com
- Orient (1901), "Autogo advertisement", The Automotive Manufacturer, 42, Trade News Publishing Company
- Krens, Thomas; Drutt, Matthew, eds. (2001) [1998], The Art of the Motorcycle, Harry N. Abrams, ISBN 0-89207-207-5

== See also ==
- List of motorized trikes
- Safety bicycle
- List of motorcycles of the 1890s
