= Thomas Auto-Bi =

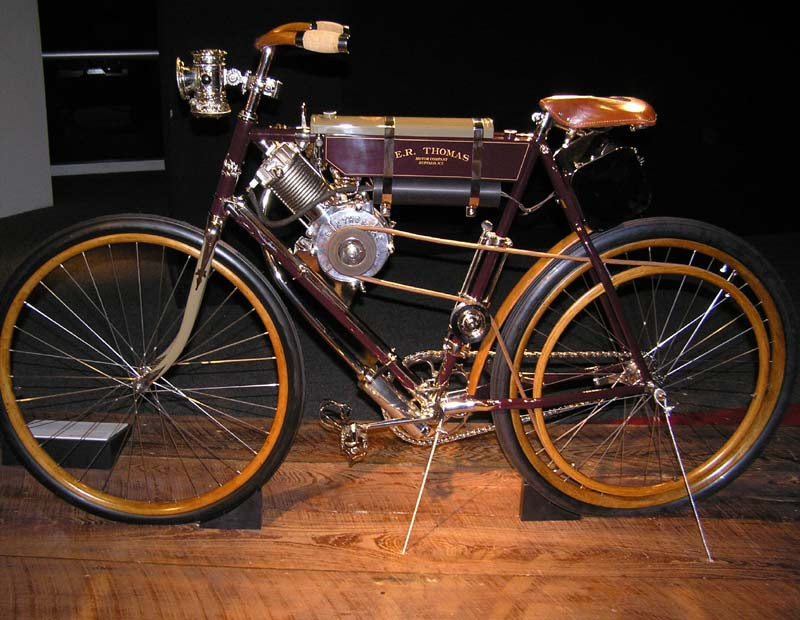
- 1900 Thomas Auto-Bi
- Manufacturer: Thomas Motor Company
- Production: 1900–1912
- Class: Motorized bicycle
- Engine: Air-cooled, four-stroke cycle, 200 cc gasoline De Dion-Bouton
- Power: 2.25 hp (1.68 kW)
- Weight: 115 pounds (52 kg) (dry)

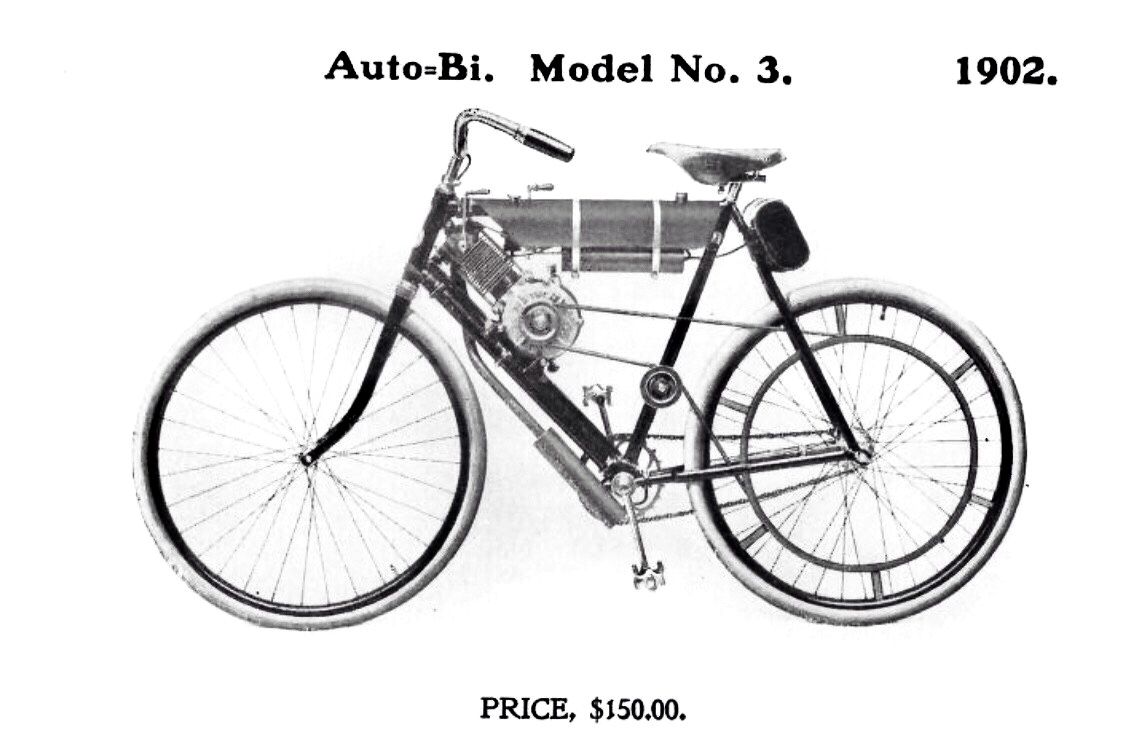
Auto-Bi Model 3 (1902)

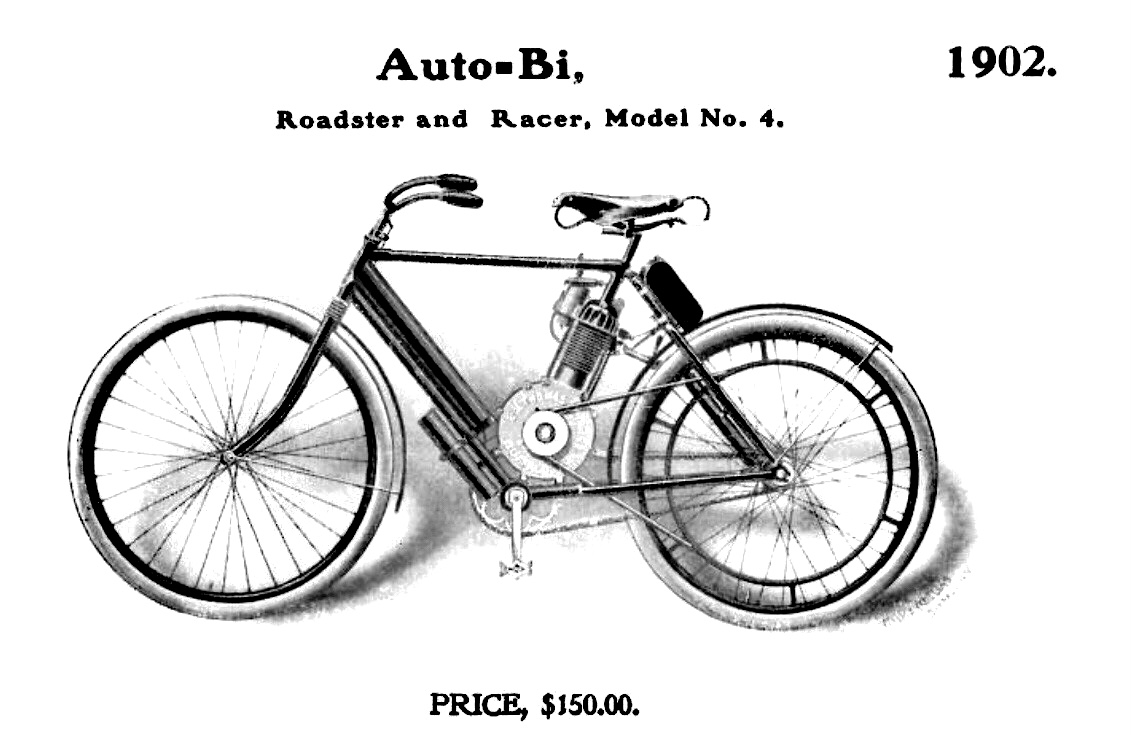
Auto-Bi Model 4 (1902)

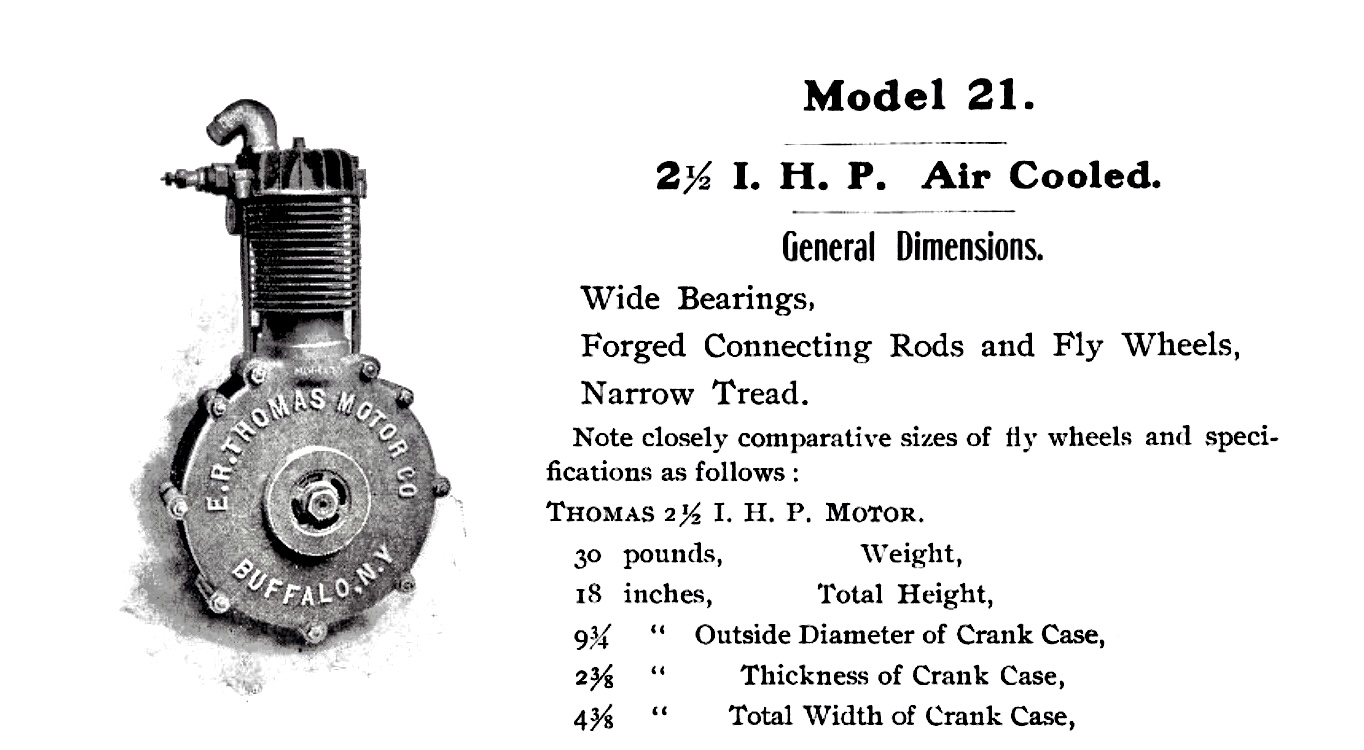
Auto-Bi Engine Model 21 (1902)

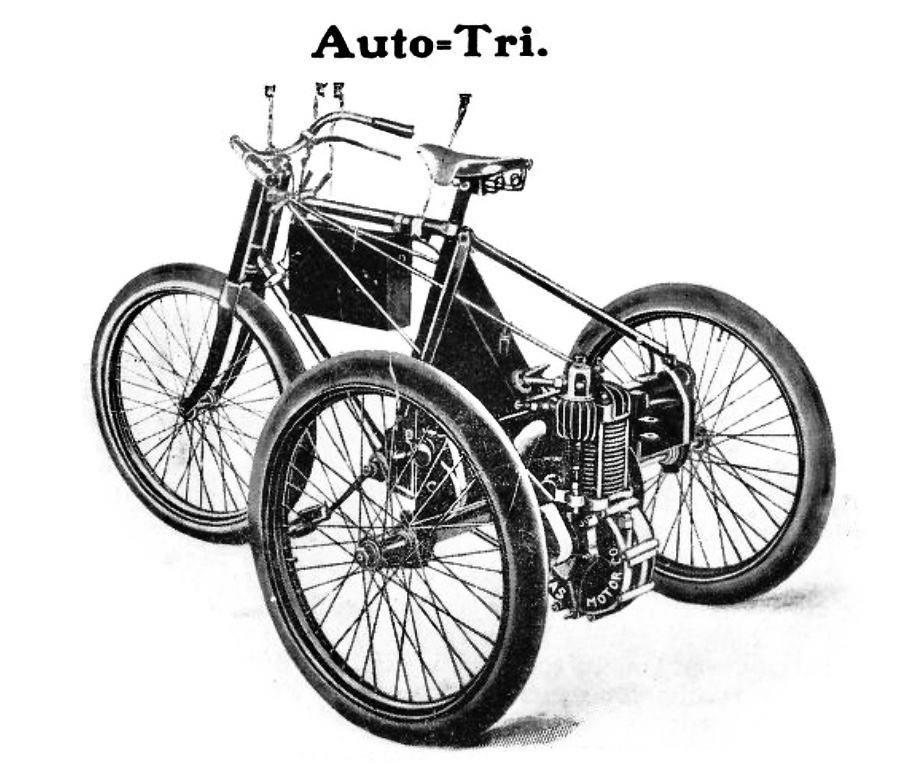
Auto-Tri (1902)

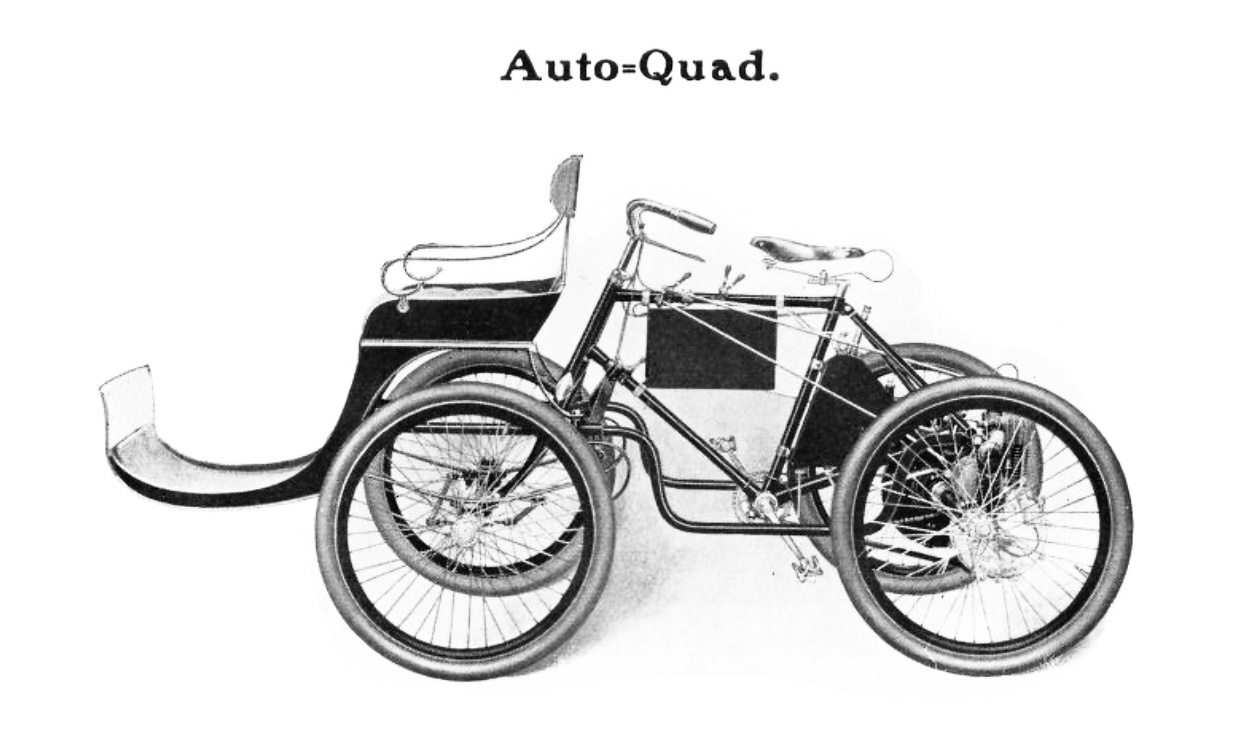
Auto-Quad. Auto-Two Tri (1902)

The Auto-Bi was an early motorcycle made by the Thomas Motor Company in Buffalo, New York. According to many sources, it was the first motorcycle widely available for sale in the United States.

== Production history ==
Thomas had been manufacturing a De Dion-Bouton tricycle since 1898. An early model of the Auto-Bi was created in 1900, and public availability began in 1901. On September 17, 1901, a Thomas Auto-Bi was mentioned in a Japanese newspaper article and went on sale 11 days later, advertised in the same newspaper.

By 1903, the company was the largest manufacturer of single-cylinder, air-cooled engines. The 1904 Auto-Bi had a 2.5-horsepower four-stroke 442 cc single-cylinder engine, a belt-driven transmission, and could reach speeds of 35 mph (59 km/h). The Thomas Auto-Bi was later joined by the Auto-Tri, a three-wheeled motorcycle, and the Auto-Two Tri, a motorcycle that could hold three riders.

In 1905, Thomas' motorcycle business was spun off as The Thomas Auto-Bi Company of Buffalo. The company credited Clarence Becker for having invented the Auto-Bi. The same year, one of the company directors, William C. Chadeayne, established a new record for a transcontinental crossing of the United States in 48 days. By 1912, the demand for motorcycles had dropped significantly, and the Thomas Motor company discontinued all production of two-wheeled machines.

== Features and specifications ==
The Auto-Bi was in all respects a standard bicycle with 28 inch wheels. It used a 200 cc capacity engine which produced 2.25 hp. This was an air-cooled, four-stroke cycle, with automatic intake valve, an engine weight of 11.3 kg (25 lb), and body weight of 41 kg (90 lb).

== Historical recognition ==
The Auto-Bi was shown at the Guggenheim Museum's exhibit, The Art of the Motorcycle.

== See also ==
- List of motorcycles of 1900 to 1909
