= William Chadeayne =

American long-distance motorcycle rider

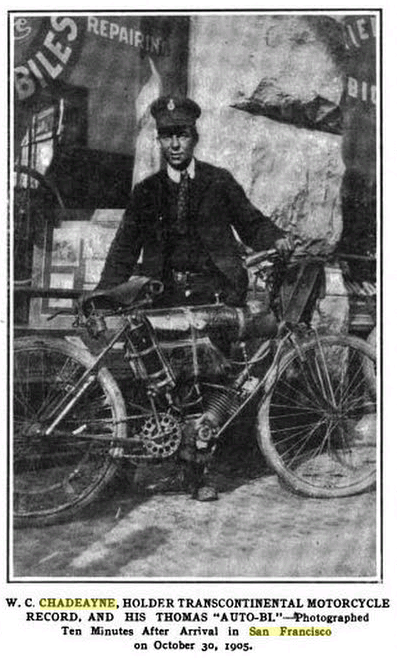
William Chadeayne in San Francisco at the finish of his 47-day transcontinental trip on October 30, 1905

William Chadeayne was an American early long-distance motorcyclist from Buffalo, New York. He set a transcontinental record for North America in 1905, going from New York City to San Francisco in 47 1/2 days. He was an officer of the Thomas Auto-Bi company and rode one of their motorcycles on the transcontinental record-setting trip.

== Transcontinental trip ==
Chadeayne's transcontinental journey took place between September 13 and October 30, 1905. He described the roads even east of the Mississippi as "unspeakably vile ... seas of mud or oceans of sand", taking exactly two weeks to arrive in Chicago. Chadeayne's time of 47.5 days beat the previous record of 51 days set by George A. Wyman two years earlier. As for Wayman Chadeayne found there were insufficient roads in America at the time so he rode on railroad tracks for six or seven hundred miles of the journey. In the portion from Ogden, Utah to San Francisco he was nearly killed by a train.

The motorcycle he rode was a 3 horsepower (2.2 kW), single-cylinder 1906 model year Auto-Bi which cost $145 new.

The trip was recognized as the second transcontinental motorcycle trip in North America, and one of the first ten by any form of motor vehicle.
