= Charles M. Falco =

American physicist

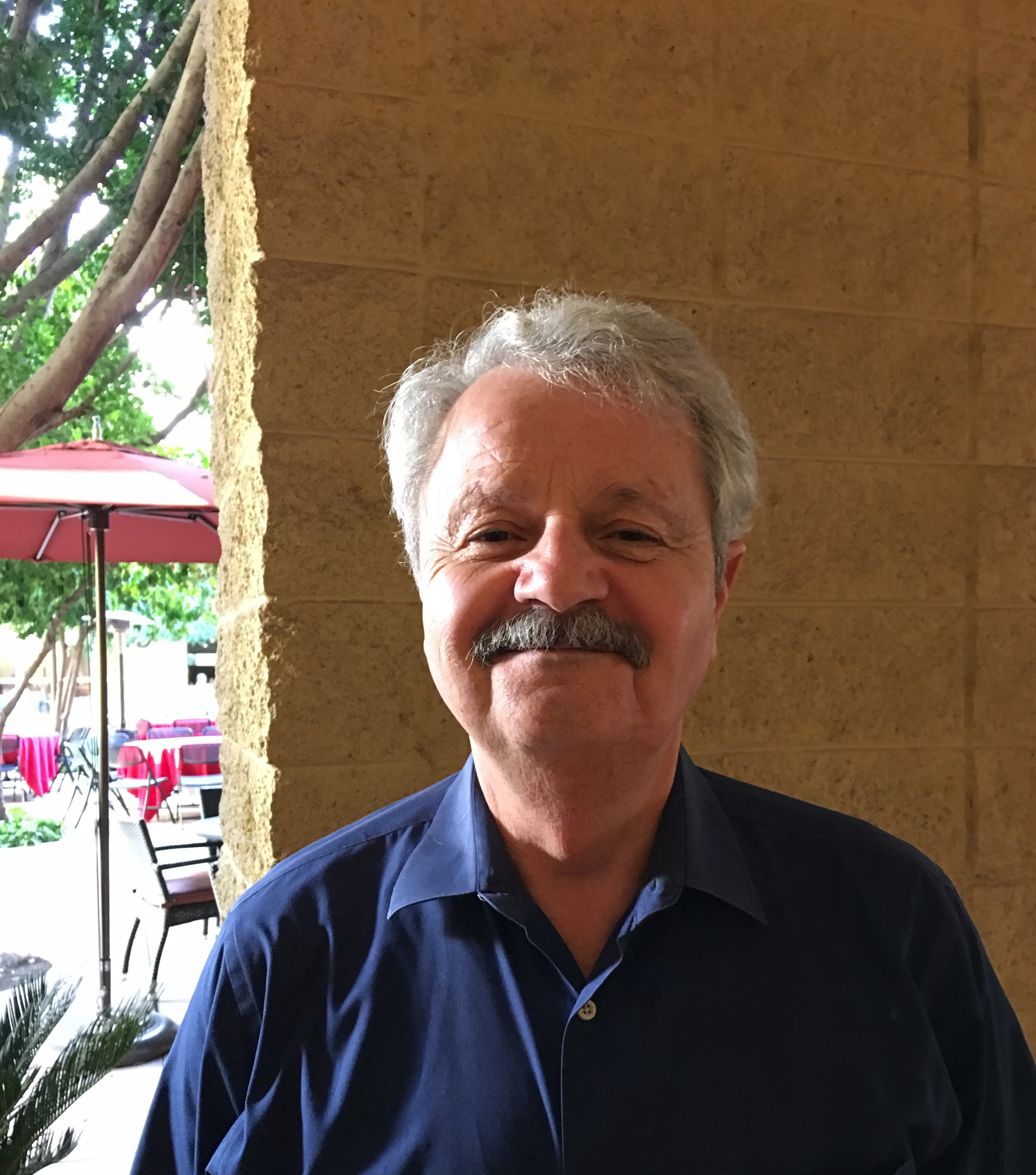
Charles Falco, physicist and art theorist, photographed March 2019 at ASU SciAPP conference

Charles M. Falco (born August 17, 1948) is an American experimental physicist and an expert on the magnetic and optical properties of thin film materials.

== Biography ==
Falco earned his Ph.D. at the University of California, Irvine in 1974 and spent the next eight years in the Solid State Sciences Division at Argonne National Laboratory, then joined the University of Arizona in 1982 as a Professor of Physics and Optical Sciences. He spent sabbaticals at the University of Paris in 1979 and 1986, and at the RWTH Aachen in 1989. The university awarded him with the UA Chair of Condensed Matter Physics in 1998, and he became Professor Emeritus in 2018. He supervised 19 Ph.D. dissertations and eight M.S. theses while at the university.

Falco was an officer of the American Physical Society, has served on the committees of 45 international conferences, editorial boards of ten journals, and review panels for the Army Research Office, Department of Energy, National Research Council, National Science Foundation, and Office of Naval Research. His scientific awards include: Industrial Research 100, 1977; Technology 100, 1971; Alexander von Humboldt Foundation Senior U.S. Distinguished Scientist, 1989; UA Chair of Condensed Matter Physics, 1998; Leading Edge Researcher, 2009; and Dwight Nicholson Medal of the American Physical Society, 2015. He was elected Fellow of the American Physical Society, Institute of Electrical and Electronics Engineers (IEEE), International Academy of Artificial Intelligence Sciences, Optical Society of America (Optica), and Society of Photo-optical Instrumentation Engineers (SPIE), has published 290 scientific manuscripts on the superconductive, magnetic, and optical properties of thin film materials and on image analysis, ten book chapters, co-edited two books, holds seven U.S. patents, and given more than 400 invited talks on his research at conferences and research institutions in 32 countries.

In addition to his scientific research, in 1971 Falco was one of three participants in Chris Burden's performance art piece '220', and since 1985 his photography has been represented by the agency ScienceSource. In 1998 Falco was co-curator of the Solomon R. Guggenheim Museum's The Art of the Motorcycle, for which he also wrote the exhibition catalog's introductory essay and bibliography. With over 2 million visitors in New York, Chicago, Bilbao, Spain and the Guggenheim Las Vegas, it was the most successful exhibition of industrial design ever assembled, as well as one of the most attended museum exhibition of any kind. For this work he received an award from the International Association of Art Critics, along with architect Frank Gehry, museum director Thomas Krens, and filmmaker Ultan Guilfoyle. In 1999, Falco was a technical advisor for the Nam June Paik retrospective at the Guggenheim. In 2020 he was co-curator of The Motorcycle: Design, Art, Desire at Australia's Queensland Art Gallery and Gallery of Modern Art (QAGOMA) and co-authored a book of that title with Guilfoyle. Falco has assembled what is likely the world's largest private collection of English-language motorcycle books, written two other books on motorcycles, edited a third, and given over 40 technical talks and public lectures on the subject in seven countries.

In 2000, Falco began collaborating with the British-American artist David Hockney, resulting in their discovery of scientific evidence in paintings made as early as c.1430 that demonstrated portions of them were created with the aid of optical projections. Hockney's 2001 book Secret Knowledge resulted in three international conferences on the "Hockney-Falco Thesis" as well as widespread coverage in the popular media, including an hour-long BBC special and a segment on the CBS show 60 Minutes. In 2008, Falco gave the 'Ziegfeld Lecture' at the US National Art Education Association, awarded for his role in this theory, and for its importance for art education. Among his over 150 technical talks and public lectures on this topic in 22 countries, in 2015 Falco spoke in the opening ceremony of the United Nations International Year of Light.

As a result of discoveries that Falco made about the 10th century polymath Ibn al-Haytham, related to the "Hockney-Falco Thesis", in 2015 he was elected Vice President of the 'Ibn al-Haytham Light, History, Science and Applications International Society', and in 2016 was appointed to the Board of the International Foundation for the History of Arab and Muslim Sciences. He has given 22 talks about these discoveries in twelve countries, as well as developed a hands-on optics workshop based on al-Haytham's writings that he has conducted for students, teachers, and Ministry of Education personnel in four countries.

Falco has served as a technical consultant and expert witness in the fields of electronics, optics, automotive, and art.
