= De Dion-Bouton tricycle =

Motorized tricycle

De Dion-Bouton tricycle made by De Dion-Bouton
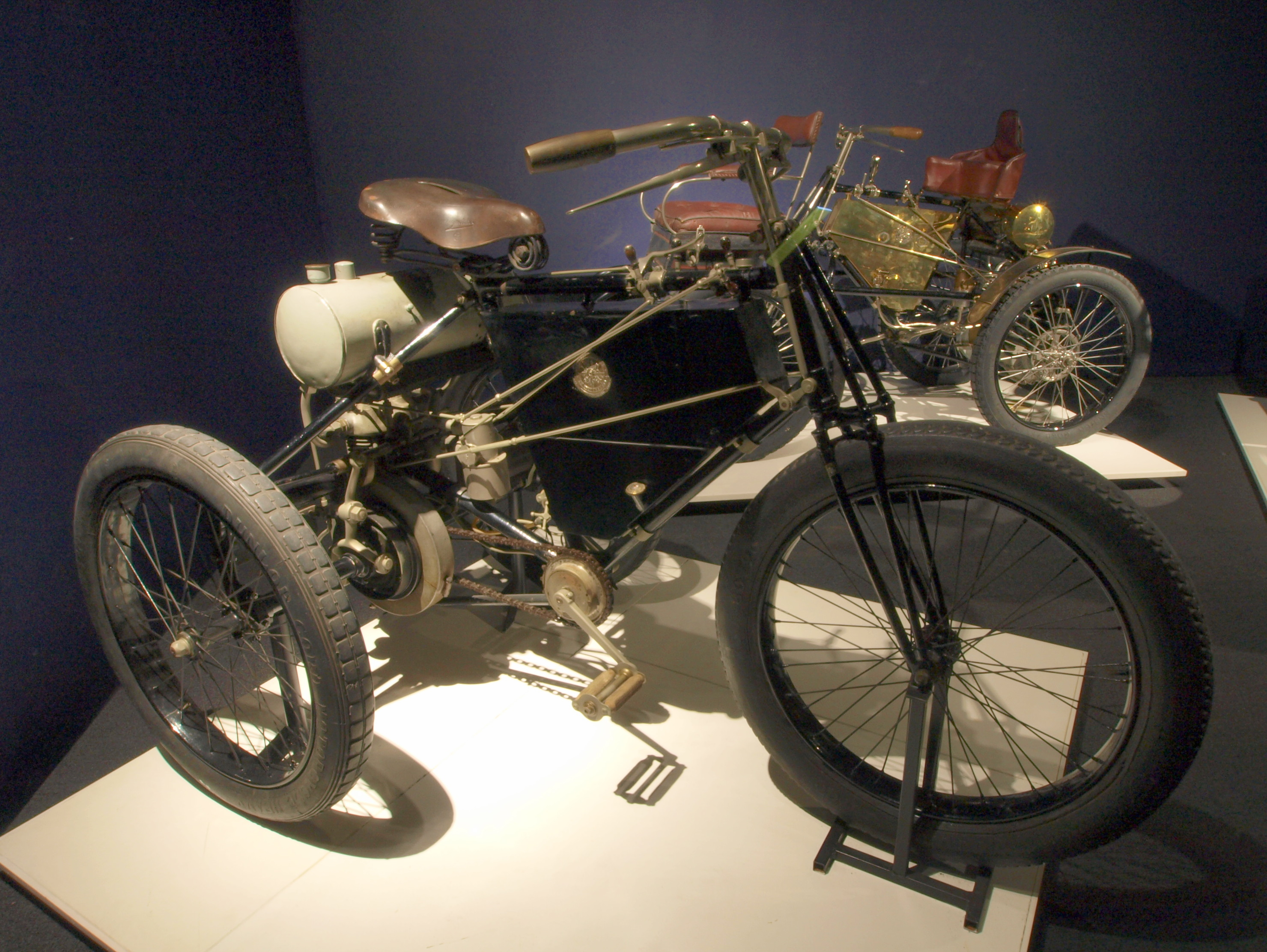
- 1900 De Dion-Bouton tricycle at the Louwman Museum, The Netherlands
- Manufacturer: De Dion-Bouton
- Production: 1897–1905
- Class: Motorized tricycle
- Engine: Single-cylinder 138–955 cc four-stroke, air-cooled with a single carburettor
- Power: 0.5–8 H
- Ignition type: Electric
- Transmission: Direct transmission, chain drive
- Frame type: Decauville
- Brakes: Front: Clasp brake Rear: Band brake
- Tires: Michelin pneumatic tires
- Dimensions: W: 92 cm track
- Weight: 80 kg (180 lb) (dry)

The De Dion-Bouton tricycle was the most successful motor vehicle in Europe from 1897 until 1901. With about 15,000 copies sold, (Note: From 1897 to 1901, without licensee and copies) the de-Dion-Bouton motor tricycle scored the first breakthrough for the distribution of motor vehicles. In particular the fast-running de Dion-Bouton engine set new standards for vehicular motors, and is regarded as the precursor of all motorcycle engines.

== Development ==
Jules-Albert de Dion, the engineer of Georges Bouton and his brother-in-law Charles-Armand Trépardoux, founded a workshop in 1882 near Paris. The first project was the production of steam boilers, then a fairly successful steam-powered tricycle from 1887, which should have already reached a speed of 65 km/h. Trépardoux, who wished to continue the further development of steam engines, resigned from the company in 1893; De Dion and Bouton opted for the development of gasoline engines after they viewed Daimler's engines at the Paris Exposition of 1889.

== Motor ==
In 1895, the first four-stroke engine was ready for production. The 138 cc (bore 50 mm, stroke 70 mm) single-cylinder engine with a surface carburettor produced 0.5 hp (370 W) at an engine speed of 1500 RPM, a remarkably high speed for the time. For comparison, Hildebrand & Wolfmüller reached 240 RPM, and the Daimler Reitwagen motor ran at a maximum of 750 RPM. Bouton discovered that the glowplug ignition was the obstacle to higher speeds, and developed a high-voltage ignition system for the motor with circuit breaker. The dry battery for the ignition is under the upper frame tube (in the case of a motor tricycle); ignition timing could be adjusted with a small lever. Side valves were driven via a gear-driven camshaft, with automatic snifting valve activation. The advantage of the design should have been very early (0–5 degrees before top dead centre) opening inlet valve. The cylinder head was removable and bolted with four bolts on the crank case. The weight of the existing cast-iron engine including all auxiliary units amounted to less than 20 kg. "The benefits of this engine were simplicity and ease."

Before its public production in 1897, Jules-Albert de Dion had experimented with a vertical bar contraption that would allow for a greater seat flexibility. After a production model was produced, Jules-Albert de Dion personally tested this model, and production was halted temporarily in favor of a redesign after he sustained serious damage to his rectum and recuperated from a shattered coccyx due to an engineering error.

== Motor tricycle ==
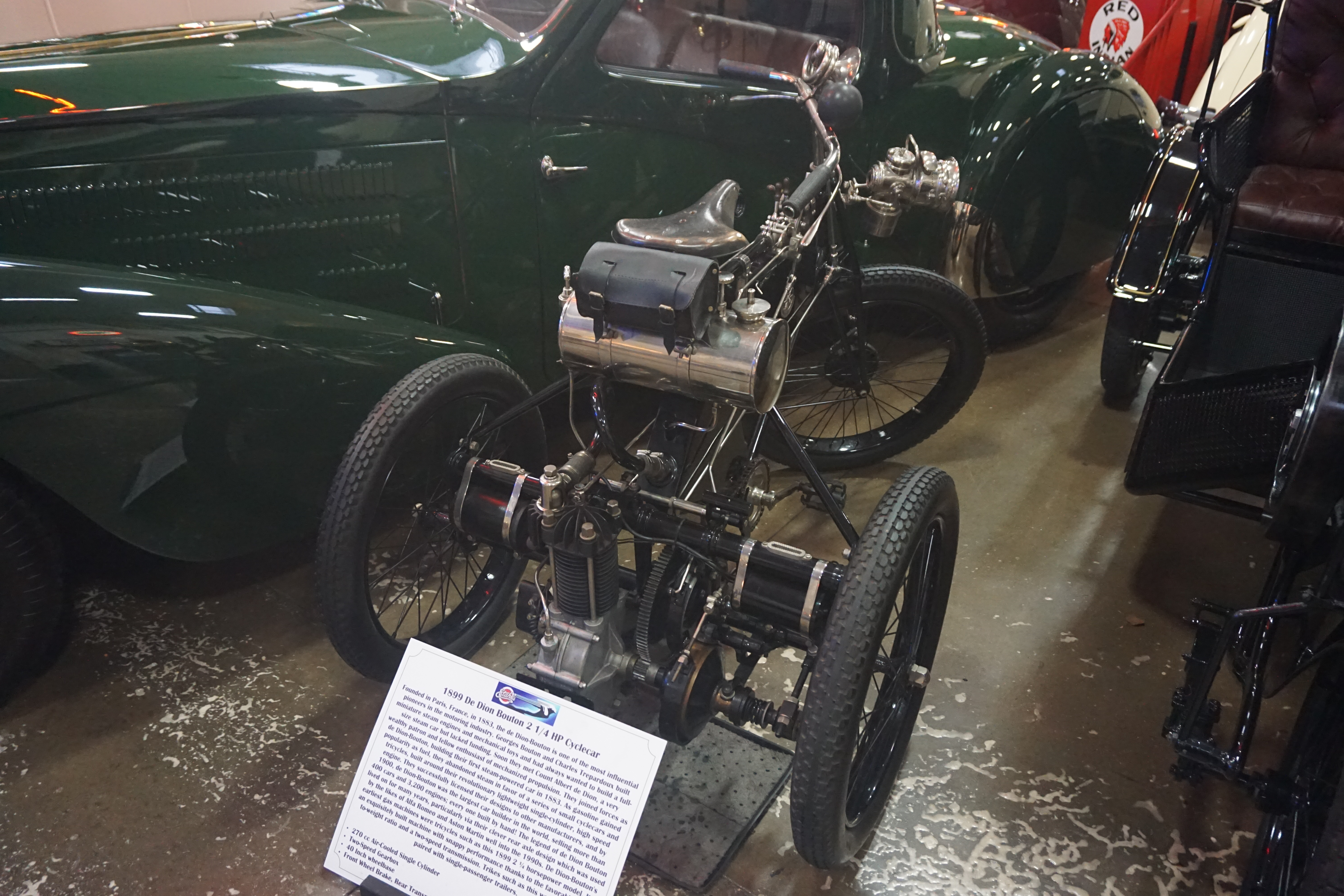
1899 De Dion-Bouton 2.25 HP Cyclecar at Stahls Automotive Collection

The De Dion-Bouton motor tricycle went into production in 1897 weighing just under 80 kg, with an output of 1.5 hp (1.1 kW) at 1,800 RPM from its 211 cc motor, although the engine had already been established in a prototype tricycle in 1895. The tricycle with track width of 92 cm was chosen, because according to Dion and Bouton "a bike appeared too fragile for this purpose." The drive was achieved via a pair of gears from the motor directly to the rear axle. A differential balanced the different curve radii. The relatively high purchase price amounted to 1000 to 1500 gold marks. The motor tricycle remained in continuous production for almost ten years. The last model (1904) increased the engine capacity and performance with a 955 cc displacement engine (bore 100 mm, stroke 120 mm) producing 8 hp (6.0 kW) at 1,800 RPM. On April 13, 1902, the French racer Georges Osmont set a speed record of 109.1 km/h in Nice with a De Dion-Bouton motor tricycle.

== Licensees and copies ==
After the start of series production of the motor in 1895, (Note: About 200,000 engines should have been produced in total) and with the production of the motor tricycle in 1897, numerous manufacturers built engines or complete tricycles either under license or copied with slight changes:

- Belgium: Antoine (Kelecom), Minerva
- Germany: Adler, Beckmann, Cudell, Express (with Aster engines), Fafnir, Opel, Stoewer
- England: Excelsior, Humber, M.M.C.
- France: Aster, Henriod, Peugeot, Werner Motors (model 1901)
- Switzerland: Motosacoche, Zédel
- United States: Thomas Auto-Bi, Orient (with Aster engines)

== See also ==
- List of motorcycles of 1900 to 1909
- List of motorized trikes
