= The Art of the Motorcycle =

1998 exhibition designed by Frank Gehry

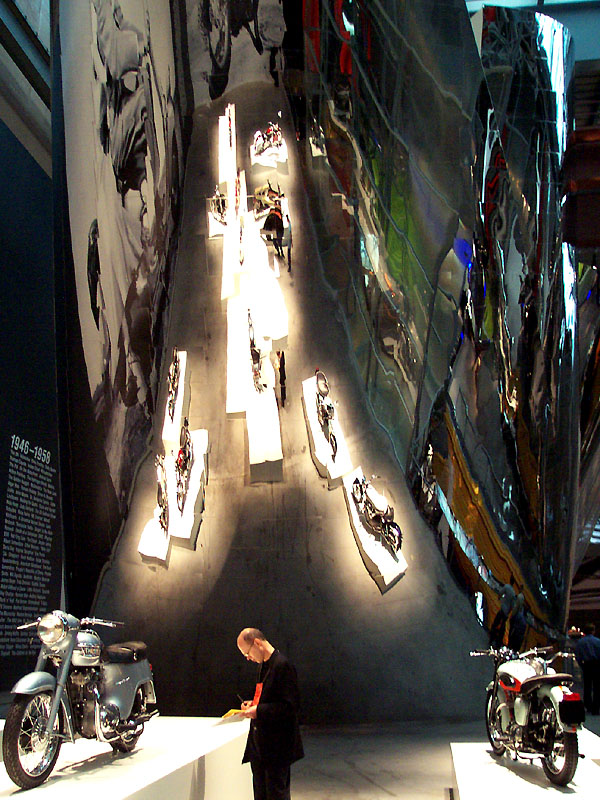
- Reflective stainless steel interior of the Guggenheim Las Vegas designed by Frank Gehry.
- Subject: motorcycles
- Nation/culture: US and other industrialized countries.
- Media: motorcycles, film, speeches, memorabilia
- Period: 20th century
- Host: Solomon R. Guggenheim Museum, New York, New York
- Major lenders: Barber Vintage Motorsports Museum, Chandler Vintage Museum of Transportation and Wildlife
- Financial sponsors: BMW, Lufthansa
- Opening Venue: Solomon R. Guggenheim Museum, New York, New York, June 26, 1998 – September 20, 1998
- Second Venue: Field Museum of Natural History, Chicago, Illinois, November 7, 1998 – March 21, 1999
- Third Venue: Guggenheim Museum Bilbao, Spain, November 24, 1999 – September 3, 2000
- Final Venue*: Guggenheim Las Vegas, Nevada, October 7, 2001 – January 6, 2003
- Total attendance: 2,000,000
- Curators: Thomas Krens, Charles Falco, Ultan Guilfoyle
- * Later derivative exhibitions licensing the name were put on by Wonders: The Memphis International Cultural Series and the Orlando Museum of Art, and others, using some of the original catalog and a variety of interior designs, but not curated by the Guggenheim.

The Art of the Motorcycle was an exhibition that presented 114 motorcycles chosen for their historic importance or design excellence in a display designed by Frank Gehry in the curved rotunda of the Frank Lloyd Wright-designed Solomon R. Guggenheim Museum in New York City, running for three months in late 1998. The exhibition attracted the largest crowds ever at that museum, and received mixed but positive reviews in the art world, with the exception of some art and social critics who rejected outright the existence of such a show at an institution like the Guggenheim, condemning it for excessive populism, and for being compromised by the financial influence of its sponsors.

The unusual move to place motorcycles in the Guggenheim came from director Thomas Krens, himself a motorcycling enthusiast, supported by a novel corporate tie-in with BMW. The motorcycles were chosen by experts including Krens, physicist and motorcycling historian Charles Falco, Guggenheim advisers Ultan Guilfoyle and Manon Slone, and others. The exhibition was described by historian Jeremy Packer as representing the end of a cycle of demonization and social rejection of motorcyclists, followed by acceptance and reintegration that had begun with the mythologized Hollister riot of 1947 and ended with the high-end marketing of motorcycles and the newly fashionable biker image of the 1980s and 1990s. Or at least the show served as "a long-overdue celebration of the sport, the machines and the pioneers they love."

The exhibition was the beginning of a new trend in profitable, blockbuster museum exhibits, foreshadowed by The Treasures of Tutankhamun tour of 1972–1979. Questions over the museum's relationship with corporate financial sponsors, both in this show and the tribute to the work of fashion designer Giorgio Armani (on the heels of a $15 million pledge to the museum from Mr. Armani) that followed shortly after, contributed to soul searching and the drafting of new ethical guidelines by the Association of Art Museum Directors.

== Exhibition ==
Postcard promoting the exhibition depicting a 1965 Kreidler Florett motorcycle

The catalog of the exhibition covered a broad range of historic motorcycles starting from pre-20th century steam-powered velocipedes and tricycles, covering the earliest production motorcycles, Art Deco machines of the 20s and 30s, iconic Harley-Davidsons and Indians, British roadsters, and on up to the striking race replica street bikes of the 80s and 90s, ending with the MV Agusta F4. The idea of the show was to use motorcycles as a way of surveying the 20th century, exploring such themes as mobility and freedom in a way that cars can no longer do because they are too commonplace and utilitarian, while motorcycles retain a unique romance.

The interior of the Guggenheim's spiral ramp was covered in reflective stainless steel, a design by Frank Gehry, with a stylized pavement under the tires of the exhibits, and the bikes not leaned over on their kickstands, but rather standing up, as if in motion, held by thin wires and small clear plastic chocks under the wheels. Early examples from the 19th century, steam cycles and three wheelers mostly, were in a single room near the entrance. The first series produced motorcycle, and the first motorcycle included in the exhibition catalog proper, the 1894 Hildebrand & Wolfmüller stood outside the gallery.

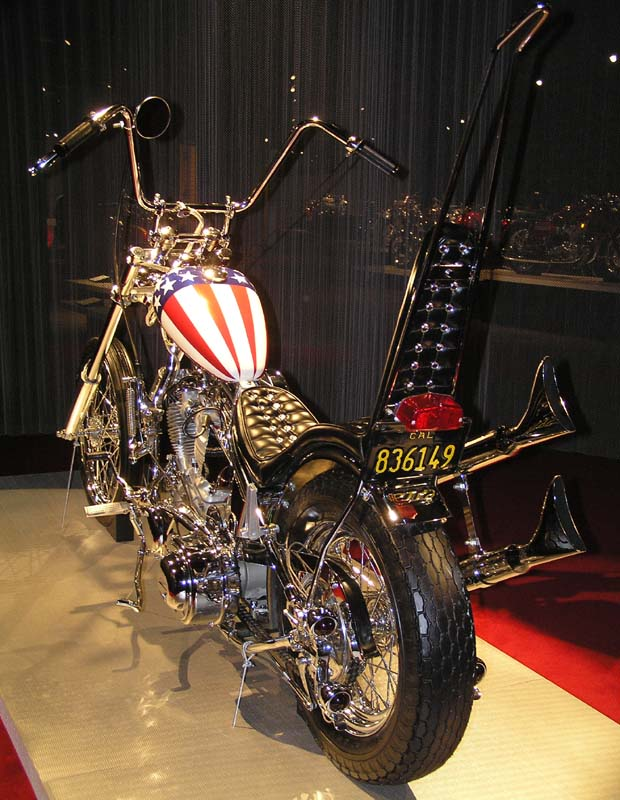
Peter Fonda's "Captain America" from ″Easy Rider"

The exhibition also featured a film exhibit, "The Motorcycle on Screen", with Easy Rider director Dennis Hopper speaking and Peter Fonda's "Captain America" being shown, as well as clips from that road movie, the Buster Keaton silent film Sherlock Jr., Andy Warhol's Bike Boy, and the TV show CHiPs.

The year 1998 coincided with the 50th anniversary of Honda motorcycles, the 75th of BMW motorcycles and the 95th of Harley-Davidson. Fifty-four collections loaned motorcycles, with the greatest number lent by the Barber Vintage Motorsports Museum, and the Chandler Vintage Museum of Transportation and Wildlife.

BMW's interest in the world of fine art was not unprecedented, as that company had experimented with commissioning prominent artists to paint some of their race cars in the 1970s, leading to the collection, the BMW Art Cars, becoming an ongoing project exhibited in the Louvre, Guggenheim Museum Bilbao, and in 2009, at the Los Angeles County Museum of Art and New York's Grand Central Terminal.

The Chicago Field Museum exhibition presented 72 of the original collection's motorcycles, and added details such as coverage of the Motor Maids women's motorcycling club founded after WWII. That show also added a participatory group motorcycle ride open to 2,000 bikers at a cost of US$50.

== Popularity ==
Average attendance was at 45 percent higher than normal, with over 4,000 visitors daily, and more than 5,000 people a day visiting on the weekends. Total attendance at the New York museum was 301,037, the largest in the history of the Guggenheim, prompting the ad hoc show at the Chicago Field Museum, where advance tickets were sold for the first time. That show was followed by runs at Guggenheim Bilbao and Guggenheim Las Vegas. The name The Art of the Motorcycle and some associated media content was subsequently licensed for shows at Wonders: The Memphis International Cultural Series and the Orlando Museum of Art. Many of the same bikes appeared at these venues. Attendance at the Chicago exhibition was 320,000, the highest since The Treasures of Tutankhamun two decades before. Attendance at the next venue, Bilbao, was over 3/4 million, and at Las Vegas, over 250,000, making the tour's total attendance among the top 5 exhibitions ever in a museum. Many attendees attracted to these shows had never been to any museum before. Copies of the exhibition's lavish, large-format 427-page color catalog outsold any museum catalog yet, with over 250,000 copies in print as of 2005.

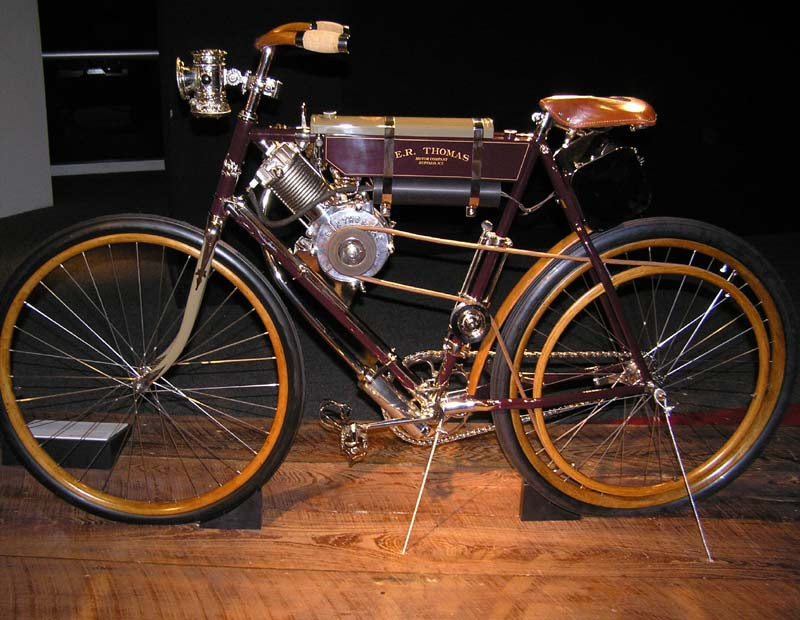
1900 Thomas. 1.8 bhp (1.3 kW), top speed 25 mph (40 km/h). Memphis, July 2005.

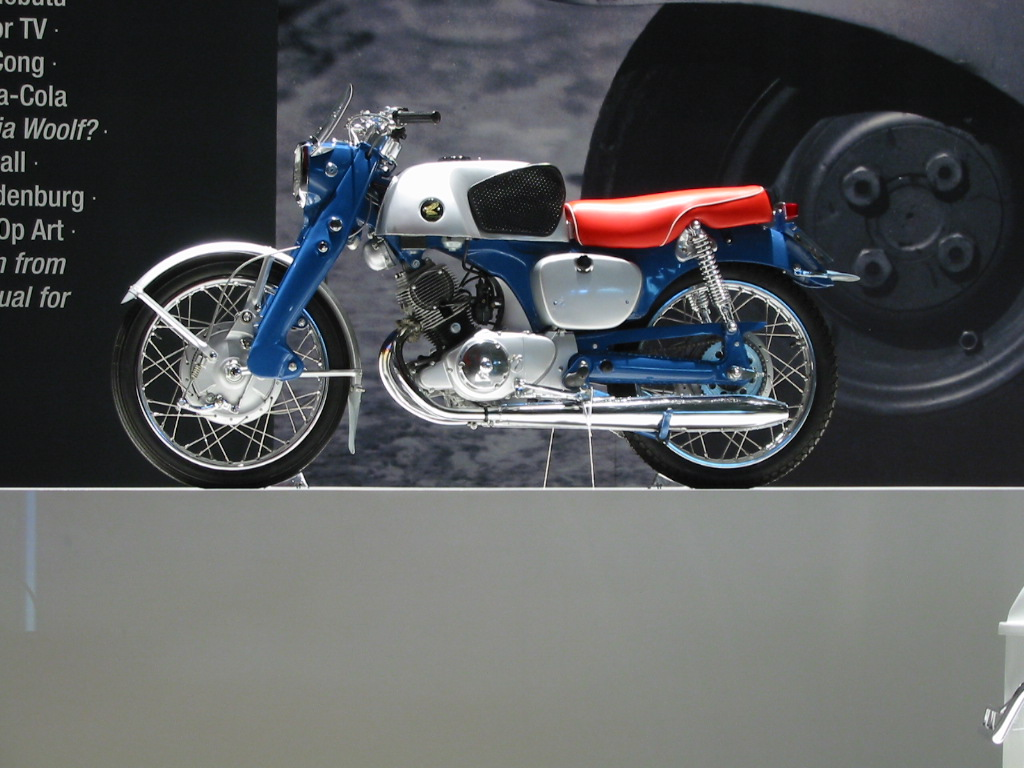
1960 Honda CB92 Benly Super Sport 125 cc (7.6 cu in). Las Vegas exhibition January 2005

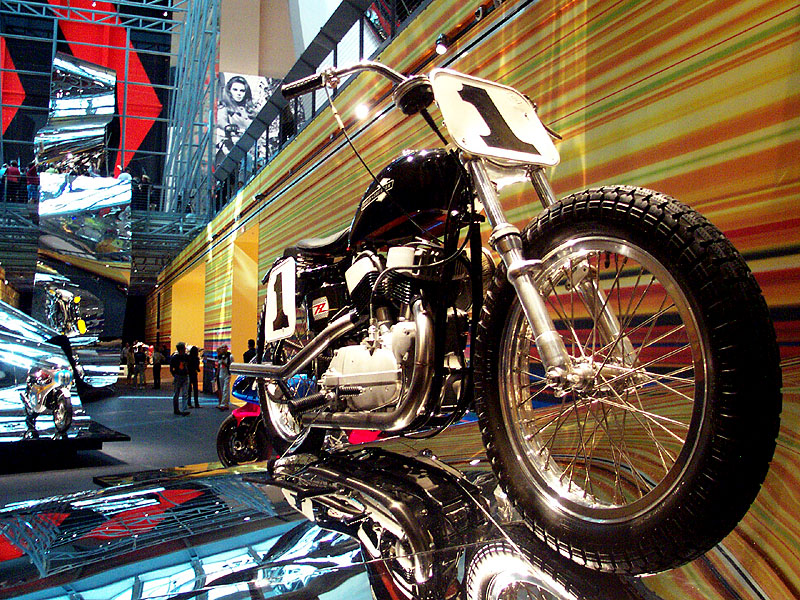
Undulating ramps built in Las Vegas created a lively effect, while in New York the motorcycles followed a sloping, spiral ramp.

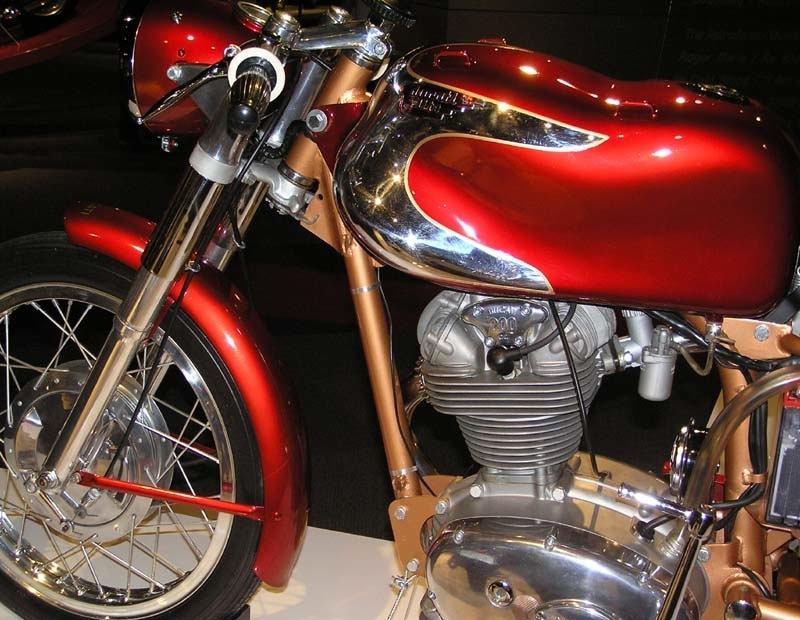
1962 Ducati Elite. 204 cc (12.4 cu in). Power: 17 bhp (13 kW) @ 7,500 rpm. Top speed: 85 mph (137 km/h). Memphis, July 2005.

== Historical context ==
In 1969 Thomas Hoving made a splash at the beginning of his career as director of the Metropolitan Museum of Art with a blockbuster exhibition "Harlem on My Mind", featuring the previously overlooked art of African Americans in Harlem, New York City and was buffeted by criticism from many quarters. Regardless of what final judgments were made on that show, the impact of the large-scale, media extravaganza art museum exhibition had been felt widely in the museum world. Hoving would go on to a successful career as director of the Met that would reach a high point with the even larger The Treasures of Tutankhamun show, setting attendance records that are still unbroken. Hoving is credited with inventing modern museum populism in his King Tut show.

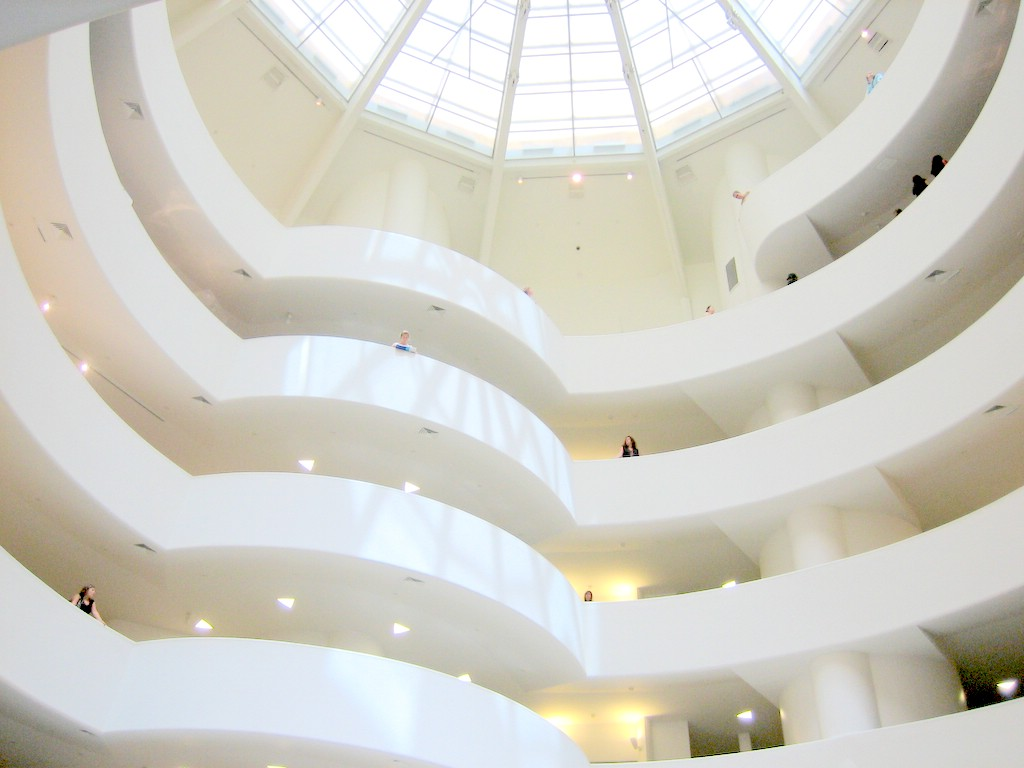
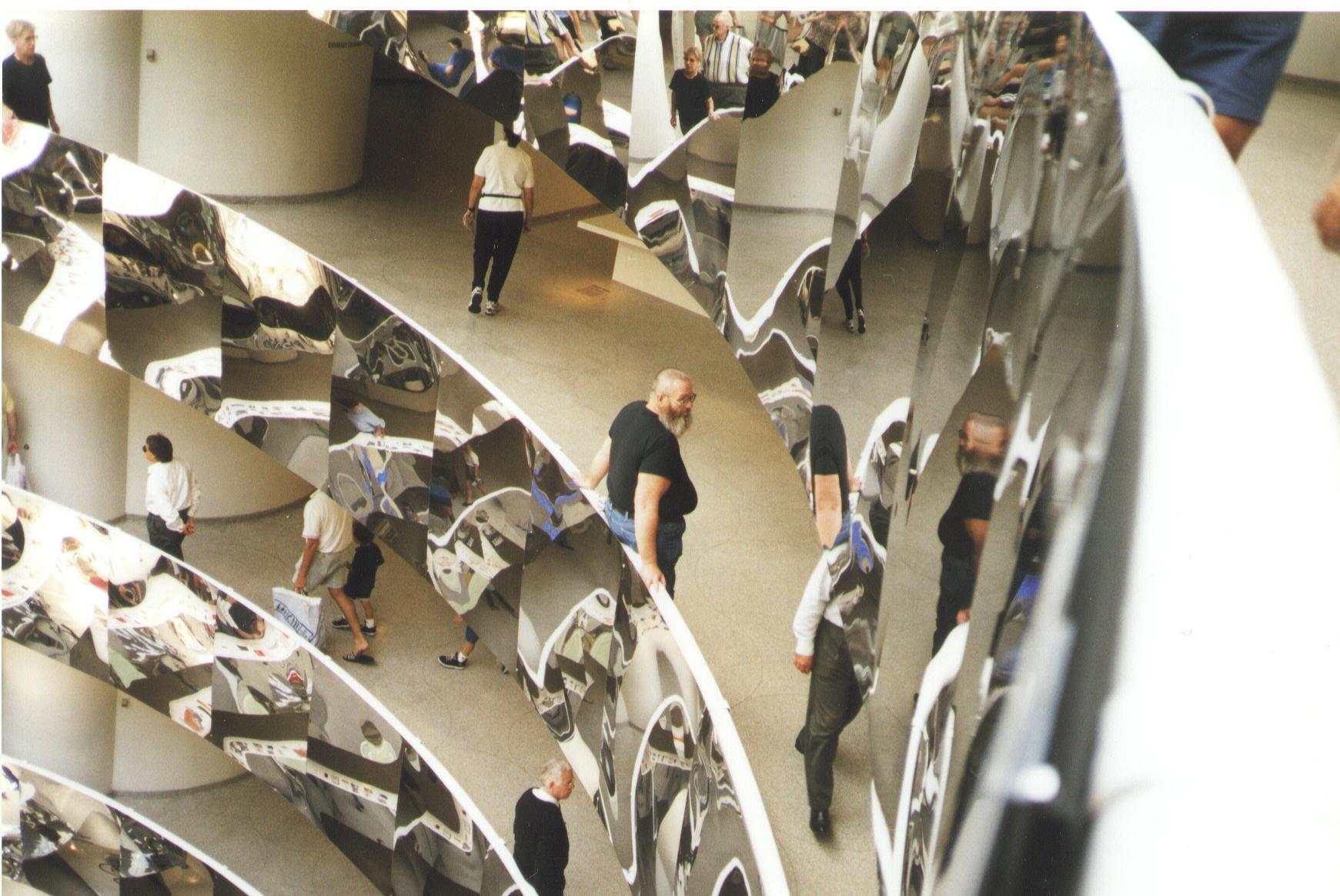
Rotunda of the Solomon R. Guggenheim museum in New York, New York (top). Frank Gehry covered these surfaces with polished stainless steel (bottom), creating the feeling of being inside a giant machine, or an engine cylinder.

Other trends were at work as well, with a succession of public museum controversies over shocking art reaching back to the sixties, but coming to a head in the 1980s and 1990s with battles over art financed by the US National Endowment for the Arts (NEA). The fights over financing of shows by Robert Mapplethorpe and others drew bitter battle lines, with most artists, museum directors, gallery owners, and critics lining up to defend free expression and public financing of art with no restrictions on content. Opponents of this art were generally focused on cutting off funding for and evicting offensive art from public spaces, but there was also a positive side to their arguments, that the proper financing of art was in private sector and art which could successfully attract private financing was by definition deserving of being shown. Jacob Weisberg of Slate saw the efforts of directors like Krens to drive overflowing museum attendance, at the cost of showing something other than, in Weistberg's view, real art, as a demonstration that they are not an elitist institution, a direct answer, and capitulation, to conservative attacks on museums and the NEA for shows like Mapplethorpe's.

It was in 1989 and 1990, one decade before The Art of the Motorcycle, that Mapplethorpe's The Perfect Moment exhibition was hounded from one venue to another by outraged conservatives. It was at this point also when performance artist Karen Finley was denied NEA funding, and Andres Serrano's Piss Christ became another center of controversy. The 1990s saw one victory after another for the conservative movement in public art and museums. The economy was booming, and a kind of optimism was felt and expressed by such colorful figures as Malcolm Forbes, whose "Capitalist Tools Motorcycle Club" toured exotic venues celebrating both wealth and a love of fine motorcycles.

In the summer of 1999, the Brooklyn Museum did battle with then-New York Mayor Rudolph Giuliani over the exhibition "Sensation", with charges of presenting sexually and religiously offensive art. In the face of all this, and the series of battles in the American culture war, The Art of the Motorcycle stood as a counterpoint, and possibly the high-water mark for the other kind of museum show: not offensive, not exclusive, but welcoming to the sensibilities of the general public. People who were baffled and irritated by modern and postmodern art could feel good about this show. The financing, while critics cried foul, was private. The show was by nature consented to directly by those who paid the bills, rather than passive taxpayers, and it was aimed at keeping the audience happy, rather than inciting rage with, say, US flags stuffed into toilets, as had been done in one famous museum exhibit decades earlier.

One decade after The Art of the Motorcycle opened, Thomas Krens has stepped aside from the top position at the Guggenheim. The New York Times' Holland Cotter has declared the blockbuster exhibition dead, victim of a weak economy that cannot afford such expensive excess, though this was on a positive note, suggesting a new and exuberant role for independent artists and smaller venues.

== Critical reception ==
Reaction to the exhibition came from two distinct camps of critics, with few having views from both. One camp rejected the very idea of The Art of the Motorcycle, having nothing to do with the machines on display in the Guggenheim or Thomas Krens' way of displaying them, nor his way of financing such a show. The other camp accepted in principle that such a show was acceptable, as art, or at least as subject for a museum like the Guggenheim, and from that basis formed a range of opinions about the quality of the show itself.

=== Outright condemnation ===
The exhibition was condemned outright by some art critics and social commenters who rejected the very existence of an exhibition of motorcycles at the Guggenheim. They saw it as a failure of the museum to carry out its social role as a leader and educator of the public's understanding of art. Rather than guide the masses toward works they might not have considered or been aware of, The Art of the Motorcycle showed them things they already were familiar with, and already liked; in other words, pandering to the lowest common denominator by giving people more of what they wanted and none of what they needed. To the extent that the exhibition responded to desires other than what made the public feel good, the Guggenheim was catering to the marketing needs of the shows sponsors, in particular BMW. They saw a great cultural institution renting itself out as an exhibition hall for a mere trade show.

In his book The Future of Freedom, journalist and author Fareed Zakaria argued that the Guggenheim's motorcycle exhibition, and other populist shows, were indicative of the downfall of American civilization in general, due to the undermining of traditional centers of authority and intellectual leadership. Zakaria writes that Thomas Krens' "gimmicks are flamboyant and often upstage the art itself," and that the point is not to get the public to look at the art anyway, but only to get them into the museum. While not rejecting that modern and commercial work should be included in modern art shows, Zakaria says, with The New Republic's Jed Perl, that the show fails to "define a style or period" and instead merely parrots current taste, giving the public validation. Due to the overly dependent relationship with BMW, the show is driven by non-aesthetic criteria, and is too politically correct and uncontroversial. Zakaria goes on to point out that, indeed, the Guggenheim gave up plans for a show "Picasso and the Age of Iron" because it was too old-fashioned to attract a sponsor, and that BMW turned down a request to sponsor a show "Masterworks from Munich" because Munich is not sexy.

Zakaria equates sexiness and buzz with popularity, which drives profit, pointing to a connection between democratization and marketization. This means bad aesthetic choices will be made by the people, rather than having informed, aesthetically sound leadership by aristocratic arbiters of taste whose wealth frees them from ulterior motives, enabling them to lead a reluctant public to perhaps challenging and unenjoyable art, that is nonetheless good for them.

These misgivings were cemented for many when the Guggenheim followed a few months later with an homage to fashion designer Giorgio Armani in a show whose financing was even more suspect. Armani had pledged US$15 million to the Guggenheim Foundation and appeared to be rewarded in a quid pro quo manner with an uncritical and otherwise unjustified marketing coup at one of New York's most prestigious venues.

This type of criticism was described by Jeremy Packer as an ad hominem attack on the stereotypical biker in service of a "rear-guard line of defense" of Western cultural and aesthetic values, perceived to be overrun by the "spiritually poor, oversexed, and insane." Such criticism was rebuked by Washington Post columnist Geneva Overholser as "dusty foolishness", a foot-dragging reaction to progress, in which some critics were hypocritically denouncing popular works in public while, in private, secretly enjoying the greater accessibility and relevance that was bringing in huge crowds, to the benefit of both museums and the public. Curator and Guggenheim director Thomas Krens defended the premise of the show saying, "We can't focus on Monet and minimalism too much. We have to keep the intellectual vitality of the institution sharp, and I think the bikes do that. They vary the rhythm of the museum and pique your curiosity about what the next show might be. This show isn't meant to be a thumb of the nose at art."

Newsweek critic Peter Plagens defended motorcycles as art by arguing that, "Just as aerodynamic airplanes are simple and streamlined, a motorcycle—which manages to balance an engine and a seat between two wheels—has a mechanical integrity, with intertwining pipes, chains and springs, that is fascinating to behold," comparing the aesthetic to the modernist, minimalist sculptures of Brâncuși. Patrons need not feel guilty for enjoying themselves, because not all visits to a museum must be endured as grim ordeals of self-improvement.

Film stills were used as backgrounds in the Las Vegas exhibition.

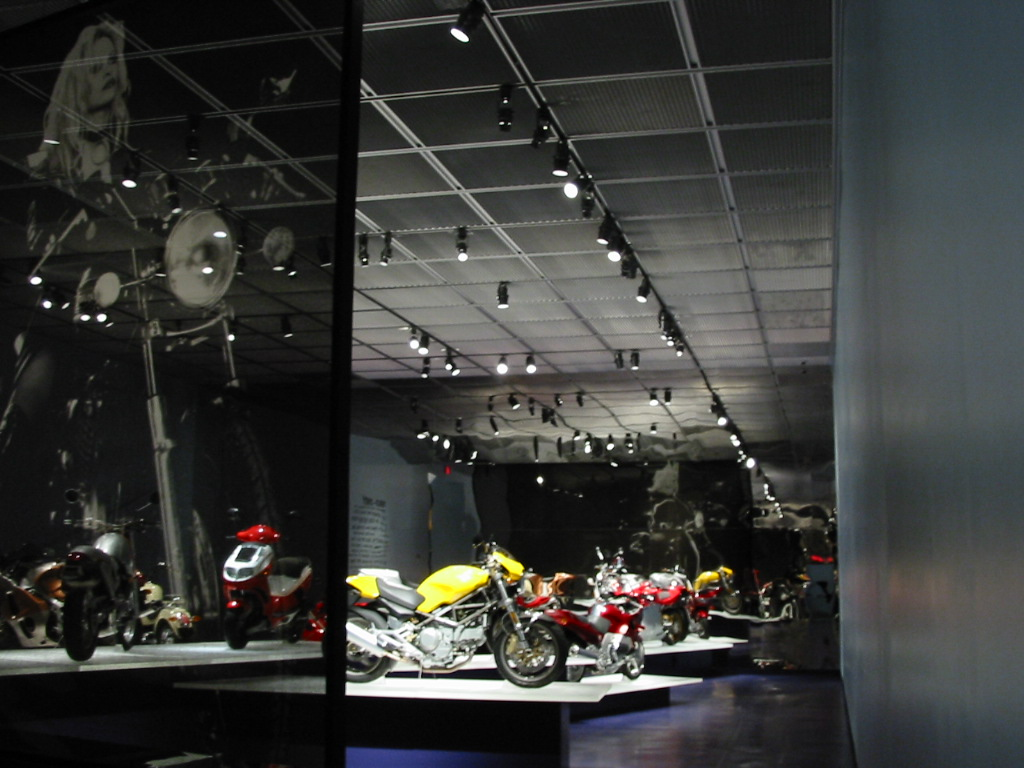
Pamela Anderson in Barb Wire (1996)

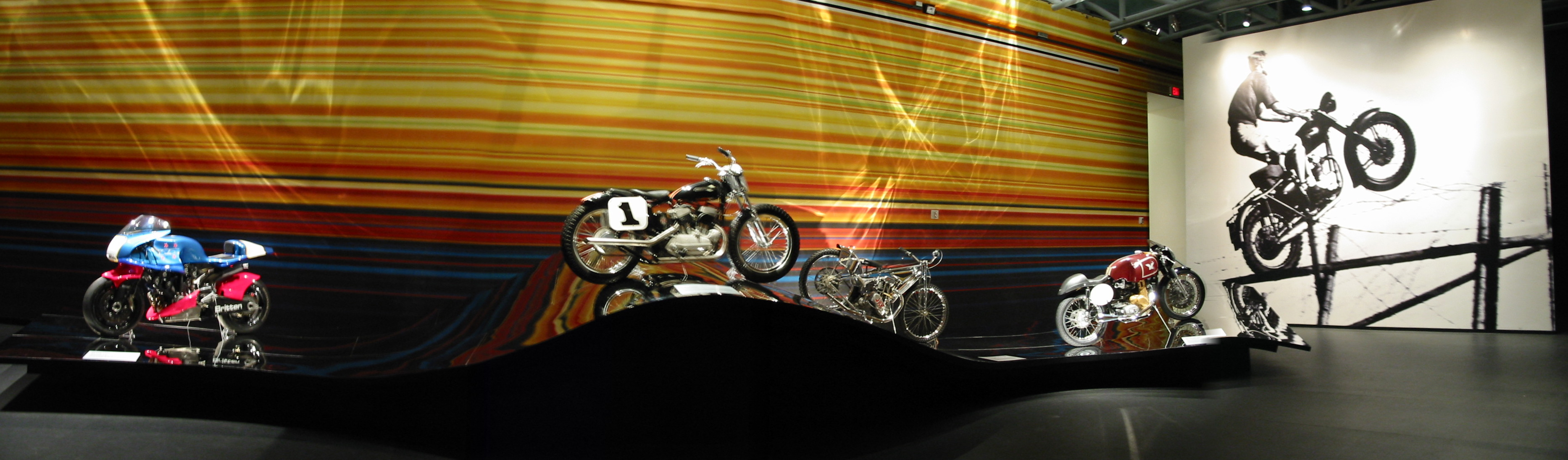
Steve McQueen in The Great Escape (1963). Motorcycles shown are Britten V1000, Harley-Davidson Sportster, Jackson-Rotax JAP Speedway and Matchless G50

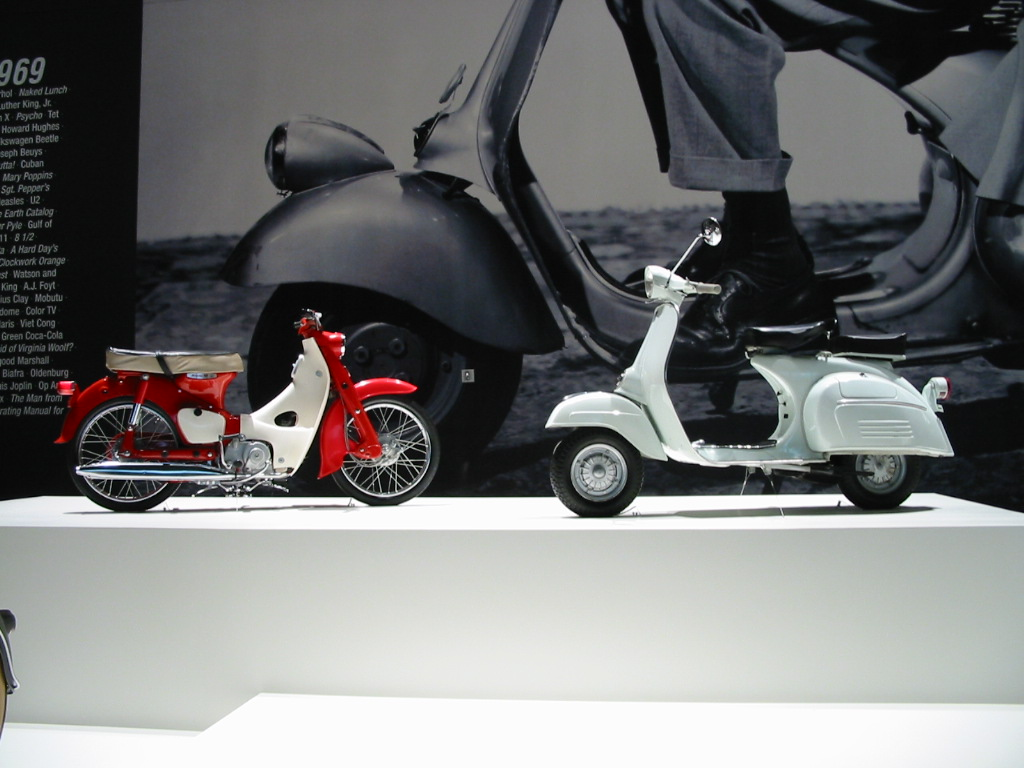
Roman Holiday (1953) behind Honda Super Cub and Vespa GS

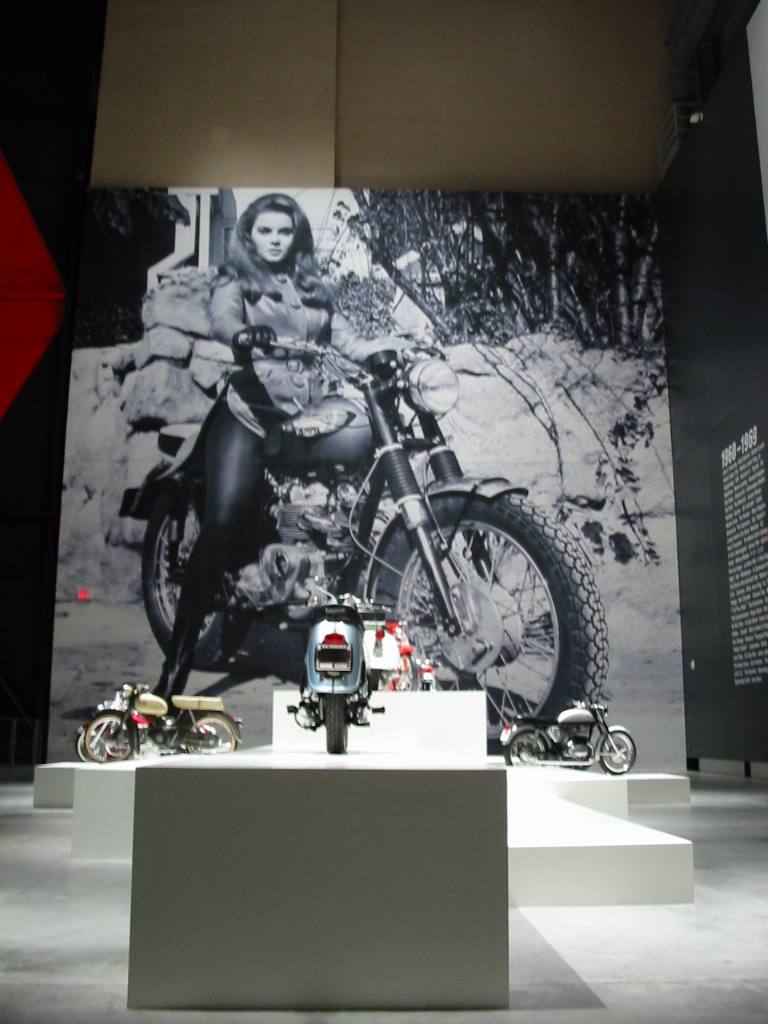
Ann-Margret in The Swinger (1966) behind 1960 Honda CB92

=== Criticism of content ===
Among critics who accepted the premise of the show and the legitimacy of motorcycles under the Guggenheim's roof, since museums have included design exhibitions before, and shown, for example, utilitarian bowls or ancient chariots as art, many still had misgivings about the way in which it was financed. While appreciative of Thomas Krens' innovative museum direction, The New York Times mused that, "one can't help wondering which came first, the idea for the exhibition or the realization that money [from BMW] would be available for such a show." A number of times the Guggenheim answered critics of BMW's involvement by ticking off the total number of Harley-Davidsons and Hondas, which were greater than BMWs included. But it was suggested that even at that, there were BMWs shown that were not significant enough to be present.

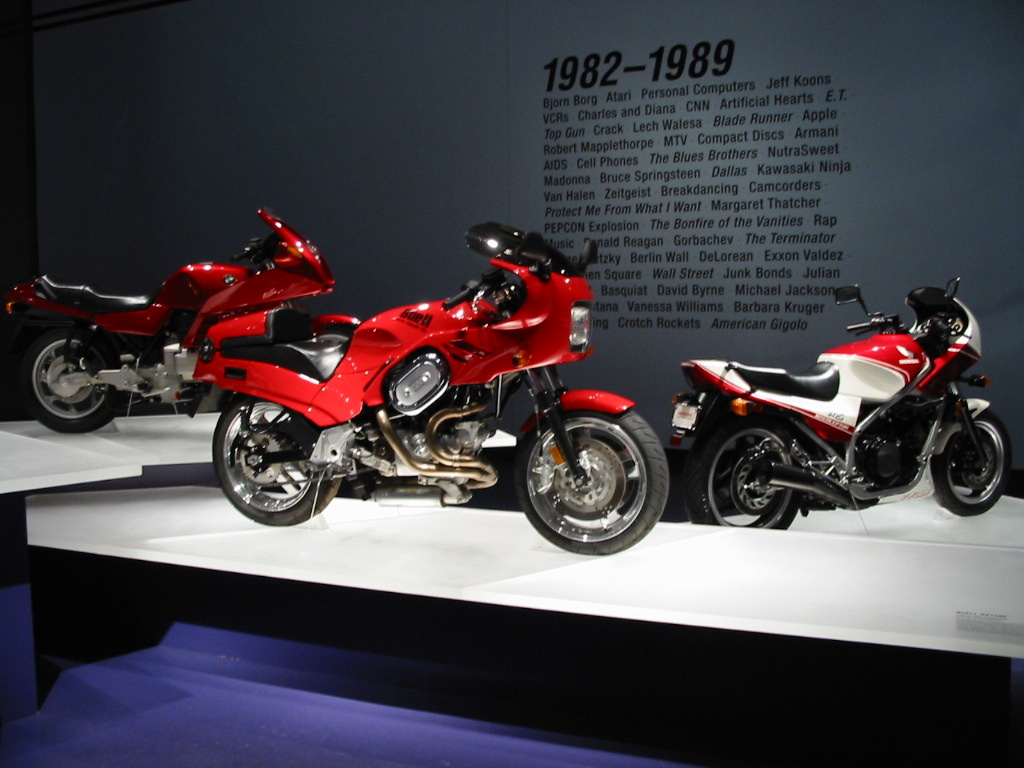
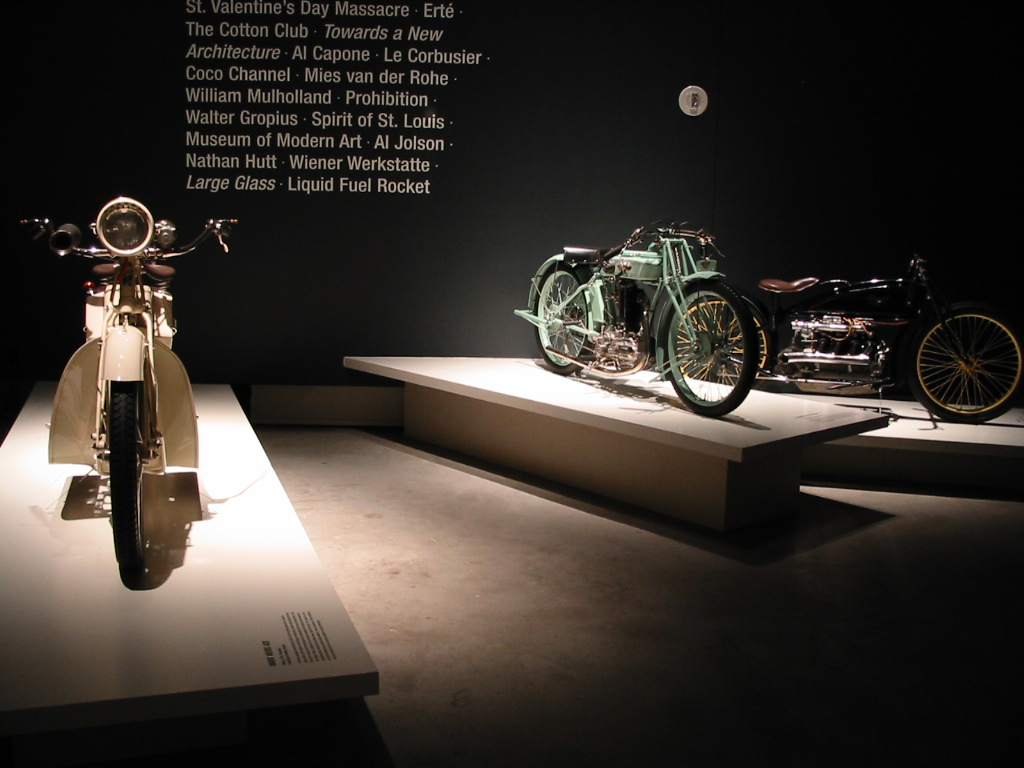
Text behind the motorcycles offered some context. Las Vegas exhibit, January 2003.

With regard to the content, the concept that the motorcycle could serve as a metaphor for the 20th century was received with interest, but some wondered whether the claim was fulfilled by the appearance of the motorcycles chosen and the way they were presented. The motorcycles shown did, at least, "illustrate technology and taste as they have evolved together in the 20th century, which is an issue basic to modern art." While there were many who lauded Frank Gehry's spare design, with only the reflective stainless steel and a terse string of words on the walls behind the bikes to evoke the decade they came from, others saw this as shallow or a failure to offer as much insight as the show could have.

Some of the text was criticized as flippant, and the connection between the social and historical context and the motorcycle designs produced from that was left unexplained. Packer contends this "buzzword approach to context forces the viewer to fill in the blanks, and it also reveals the extent to which the museum display is predicated upon the assertion of a naturalized link between essentialized culture and the artifacts that are said to emanate from it," so The Art of the Motorcycle was constructing the illusion that motorcyclists are a monolithic subculture rather than being different kinds of riders having "numerous relationships to motorcycling."

Packer also argues that "progressivist, developmentalist logic was underpinned by the chronological ordering" of the exhibits themselves, with the clean, productive member of the establishment image of motorcyclists found at the end of the progression.

The New York Times' Jim McCraw was satisfied that, "All the great bikes of the 20th century are represented," and the catalog is "impressive in its depth, breadth and purpose, worth several visits for avid motorcyclists." However, McCraw pointed out the following omissions: the Wankel-engined Suzuki RE5, the inline-6 Honda CBX1000 (instead the less popular but antecedent Benelli 750 Sei was included), any of the Japanese turbocharged motorcycles of the 1980s–1990s, the world's fastest motorcycle in the quarter mile at the time, the Yamaha R1, the motorcycle with greatest top speed at the time, the Honda CBR1100XX, and no police motorcycles at all. James Hyde of Art in America pointed to the omission of the Moto Guzzi V8.

Slate's Jacob Weisberg found 114 motorcycles in the catalog to be too many, and too boring for the non-motorcycle aficionado. In contrast to critics like Zakaria, Perl, and Hilton Kramer, who want museums to challenge and educate the public with difficult art like abstract expressionism, which might require a little homework to learn to like, Weisberg complained that the information accompanying the motorcycle exhibits was too technical and bewildering to the non-gearhead, with talk of self-aligning bearings, compression ratios and near-hemispherical combustion chambers. That is, he wrote, "the approach is design-technical rather than design-aesthetic or design-cultural," and thus it failed to make the case that industrial design is more than just the "stepchild of fine art" and that "the cross-fertilization of high and pop is an important part of the story of artistic modernism."

The selection of motorcycles was overwhelmingly Western, and mostly limited to motorcycles of the United States market, and mostly of the high end, leaving out utilitarian examples. One scooter is present, and one motorcycle truly for the masses, the Honda Super Cub. That motorcycles are the number one mode of transport in a great many countries such as Malaysia and Indonesia, and thus central to the lives of most of the world's population was completely ignored by The Art of the Motorcycle, and little mention was made of the design context of creating motorcycles for this market. Creative uses of motorcycles in the developing world, such as the tuk tuk and similar vehicles, was overlooked. Even the critical role that motorcycles played as utilitarian transport prior to the advent of the Ford Model T was left largely out. Instead, motorcycling was seen through the lens of the late 20th century American: a form of recreation, and most of all, a form of self-expression. There were critics, such as The New York Times' Michael Kimmelman, who, somewhat playfully, shared this US-centric point of view, in that "motorcycles are frivolous to begin with: they're about irresponsibility, about not conforming, about getting away. Or at least they're about embracing the image of nonconformity."

== Legacy ==
In the year following the opening of the Guggenheim motorcycle exhibition, The Metropolitan Museum of Art presented Rock Style, featuring music performance costumes, sponsored by Tommy Hilfiger, Condé Nast Publications, and Estée Lauder Companies, seen by The Guardian's Michael Ellison as corporate-museum interdependency similar to the BMW and Armani shows at the Guggenheim. In addition to touring their Art Cars in various museums, BMW has continued to find new ways to be a major player in the arts, in accordance with their marketing goals, for example in the 2006 "BMW Performance Series" featuring jazz music and black filmmakers, all overtly targeted at black car buyers.

After the Las Vegas exhibit, derivative versions of The Art of the Motorcycle were presented at Wonders: The Memphis International Cultural Series and Orlando Museum of Art. The Legend of the Motorcycle concours was in part inspired by the success of the Guggenheim's exhibit. A group of celebrity movie actors, friends of the "consummate showman" Thomas Krens named themselves the "Guggenheim Motorcycle Club" and rode motorcycles on various adventures in Spain and elsewhere. The Motorcycle Hall of Fame museum's 2008 MotoStars event, designed to "go even further" than the Guggenheim shows, was anchored by celebrity appearances, and included Krens and co-curator Charles Falco. A forthcoming exhibition at the Bermuda National Gallery, inspired by The Art of the Motorcycle, will use the identical concept of the motorcycle as "possible metaphor for the 20th century." The Penrith Regional Gallery's curator was inspired in part by the Krens' success in New York City to create the 2009 Born To Be Wild: The Motorcycle In Australia, an examination of the motorcycle in contemporary art.

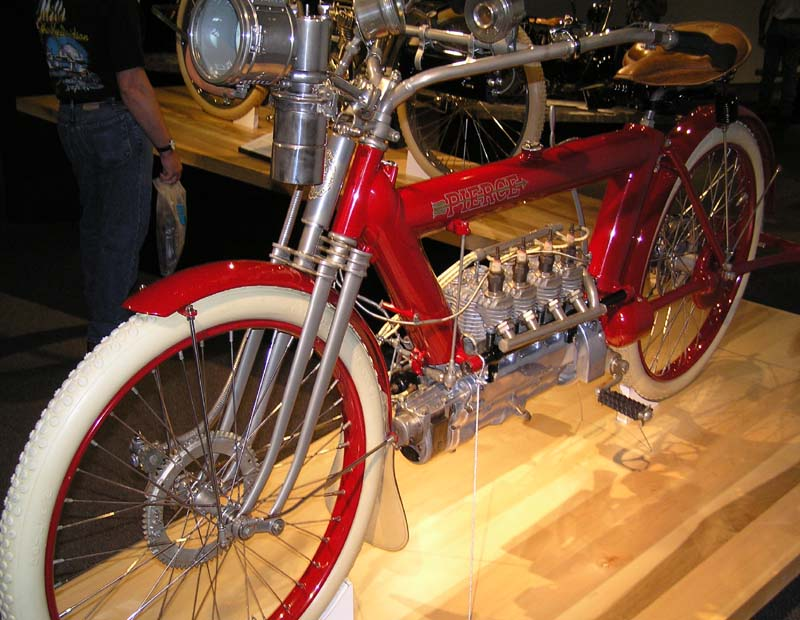
1910 Pierce Four. Power: 4 bhp (3.0 kW). Top speed: 60 mph (97 km/h). Memphis exhibition, July 2005.

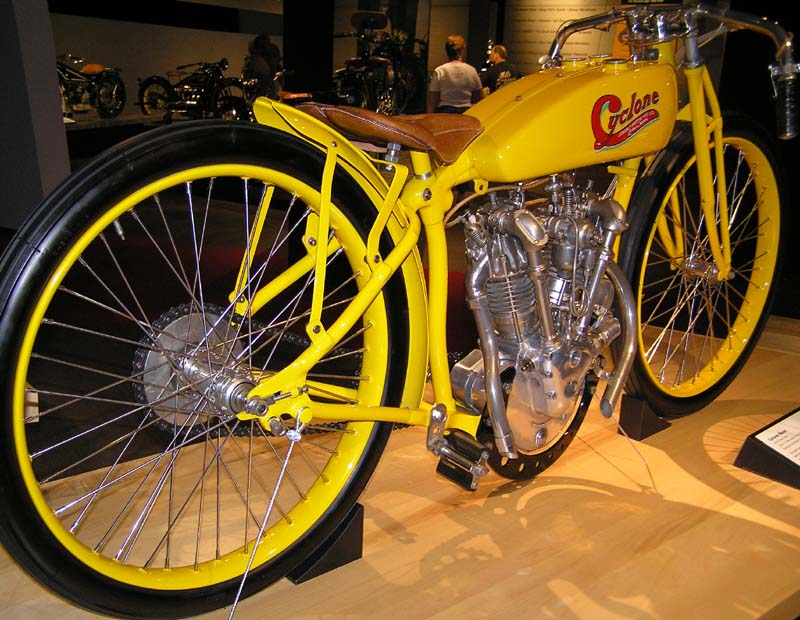
1914 Cyclone. 61 cu in (1,000 cc). Power: 45 bhp (34 kW) @ 5,000 rpm. Top speed: unknown. Memphis exhibition, July 2005.

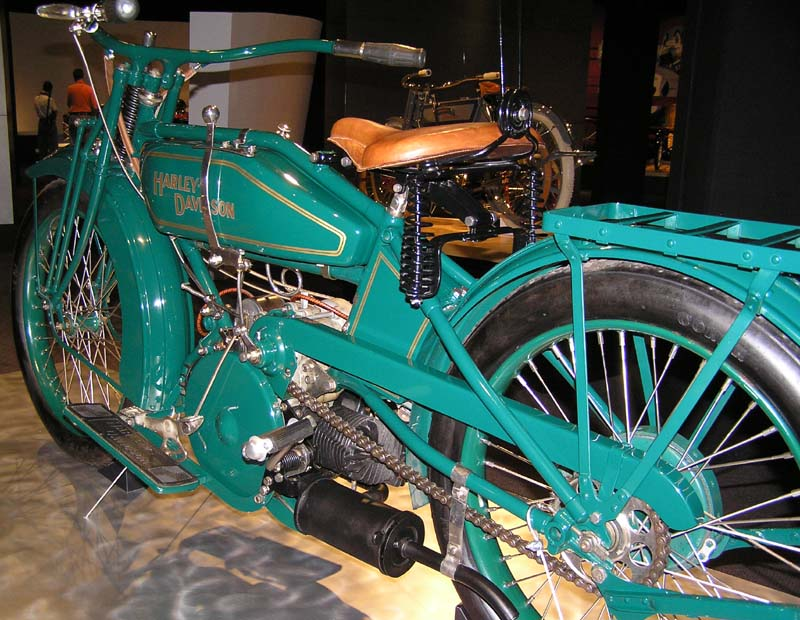
1919 Harley-Davidson Model W Sport Twin. 36 cu in (590 cc), Power: 6 bhp (4.5 kW). Top speed: 50 miles per hour (80 km/h). Memphis exhibition, July 2005.

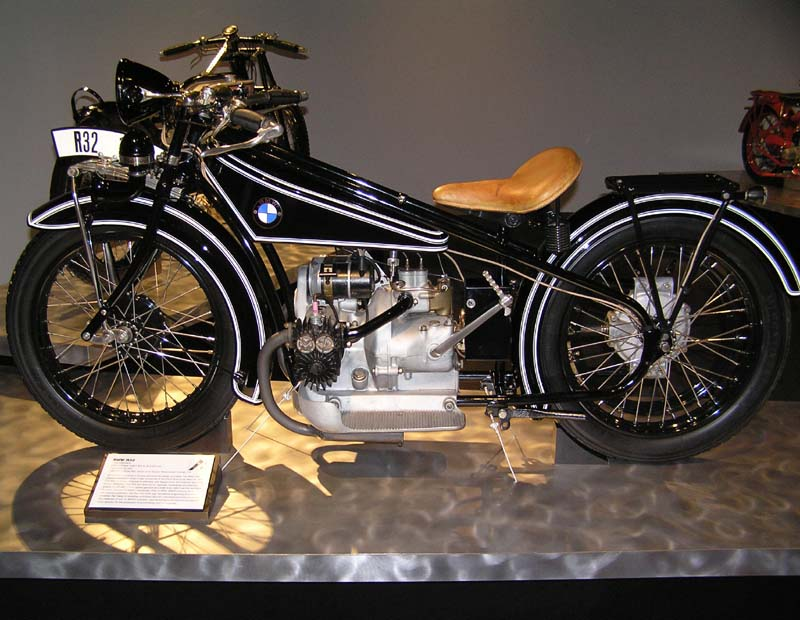
1923 BMW R32. 494 cc (30.1 cu in), Power: 8.5 bhp (6.3 kW) @ 3,200 rpm. Top speed: 62 mph (100 km/h). Memphis exhibition, July 2005.

== See also ==
- List of motorcycles in The Art of the Motorcycle exhibition
- Outline of motorcycles and motorcycling
