= FN Tricar =

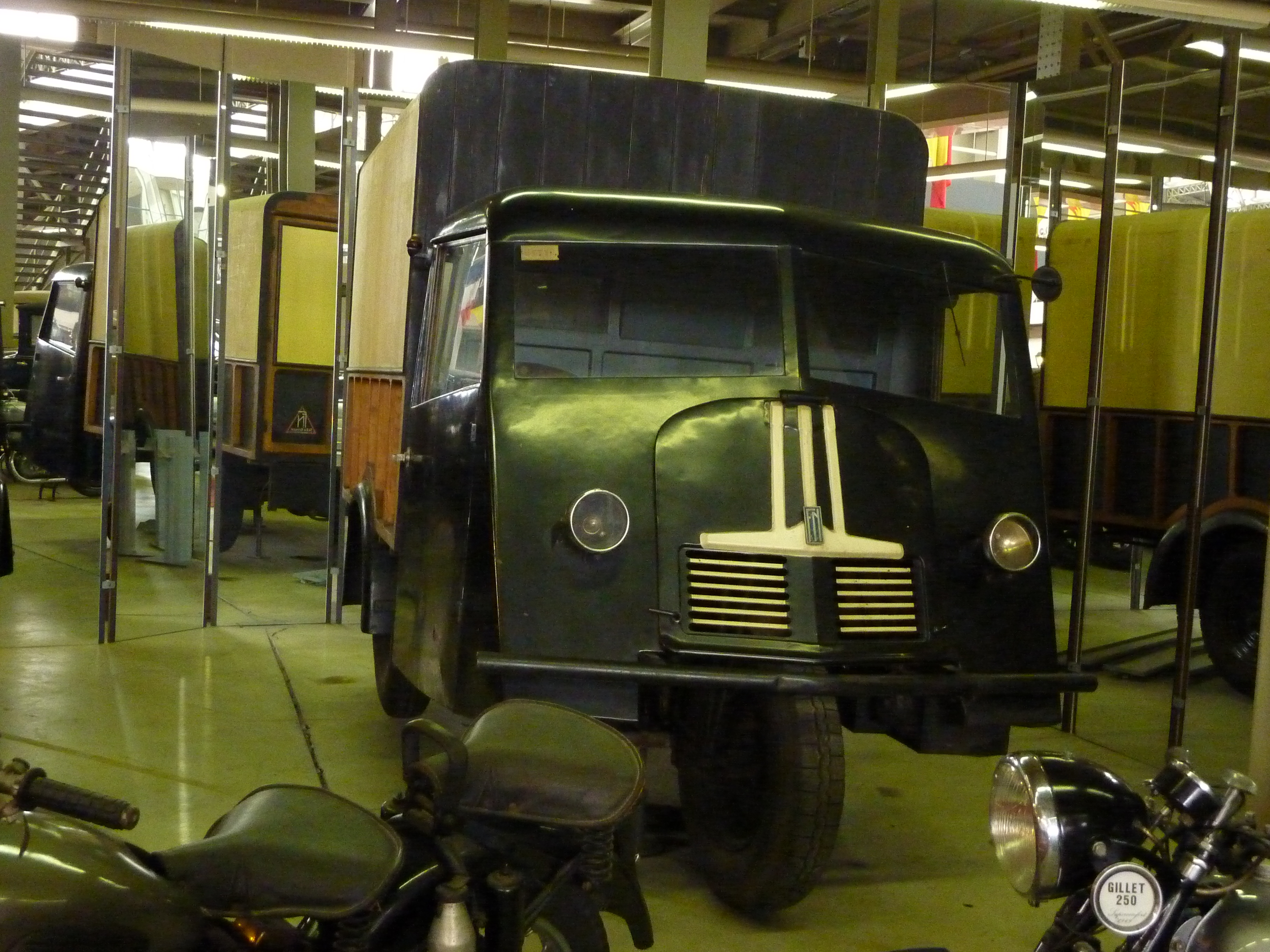
- Manufacturer: FN, Fabrique Nationale d‘Armes de Guerre, Liége
- Production: 1940
- Engine: 2x engines generating 4000rpm
- Bore / stroke: 992 cc
- Power: 22 hp
- Dimensions: L: 3.4m W: 1.7m H: 1.5m
- Weight: 1,050 kg (2,310 lb) (dry)

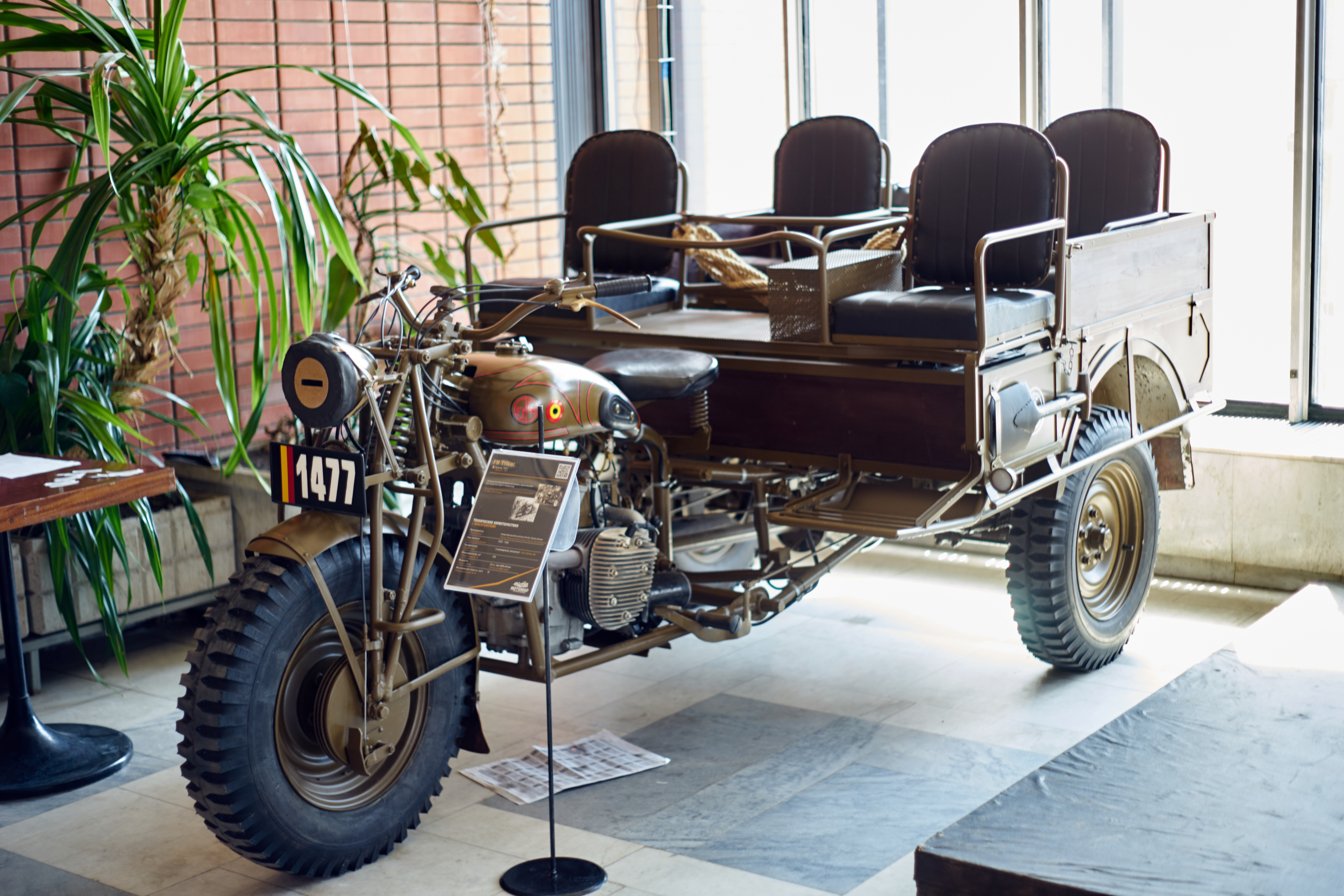
FN Tricar 1939

The FN Tricar was a military motorcycle manufactured before WW2 by FN Herstal of Belgium. As of 2014, around only 7 exist and owned by private collectors.

== Users ==
- Argentina
- Belgium
- Brazil
- Dutch East Indies
- Germany
- Portugal
- Republic of China

== See also ==
- FN (motorcycle)
