= FN Four =

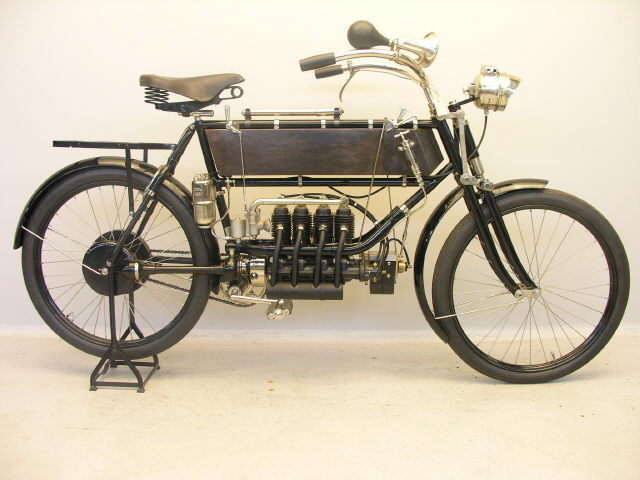
- 1905 FN Four
- Manufacturer: Fabrique Nationale
- Production: 1905–1923
- Engine: 350-750 cc (max) inlet-over-exhaust with compression release
- Bore / stroke: 45 mm x 57 mm
- Power: 5 hp (3.7 kW) (498 cc version)
- Ignition type: Magneto
- Transmission: Shaft drive
- Frame type: Steel duplex cradle
- Suspension: Front: Bottom-link fork Rear: Rigid
- Fuel capacity: 1.5 US gal (5.7 L; 1.2 imp gal)

The FN Four was the world's first production inline-4 motorcycle, manufactured in Liége by Fabrique Nationale from 1905 until 1923. It was also, at 40 miles per hour (64 km/h), the world's fastest production motorcycle from 1911 until 1912.

The motorcycle was developed in 1904, tested late that year, and had its public debut at the 1905 Paris Motorcycle Show. It was a commercial success upon release, with production increasing over its twenty-year run.

== Technical details ==
The motorcycle was originally single-speed. In 1909, a two-speed transmission was offered, then three-speed in 1914 with the 748 cc engine. It had a single-speed shaft drive turned by a bevel gear. The rider started the engine by pedaling bicycle style pedals with a chain drive and sprockets to the rear wheels. The 1905 model had a high-tension Bosch magneto ignition, a spray carburetor, and a rear coaster brake operated by the pedals. It had a 5:1 reduction ratio to 26-inch wheels.

By 1908, it had a two speed transmission with a plate clutch, overcoming the speed limitations of the earlier model. In 1909 a rear drum brake was fitted. In 1910 the engine was redesigned and enlarged to 498 cc (30.4 cu in), the carburetor was moved and a new oiling system was used. The weight in 1910 was 165 lb (75 kg).

For the US market, the 1908 model was upgraded and released as a 1908 1/2 model, called the F.N. Big Four. Engine power was raised from 4 1/2 hp (3.4 kW) to 5 hp (3.7 kW), the frame size was reduced from 22 to 20 inches (560 to 510 mm) allowing the rider to sit with both feet on the ground, the wheel rims were made heavier and would fit American tire sizes, and it came with tires with a heavier tread.

The 1911 model weighed 185 lb (84 kg) and had a wheelbase of 56 in (1,400 mm). The US model had either Goodrich or another imported brand of tires, and a leather seat made by the Mesinger Bicycle Saddle Company of New York. By 1911 bore × stroke was up to 2 1/16 in × 2 1/16 in (52 mm × 52 mm) and nominal output was up to 6 hp (4.5 kW).

The motorcycle had bicycle-style pedals used for starting until 1913, when a kickstarter was adopted.

=== Four-cylinder engine ===
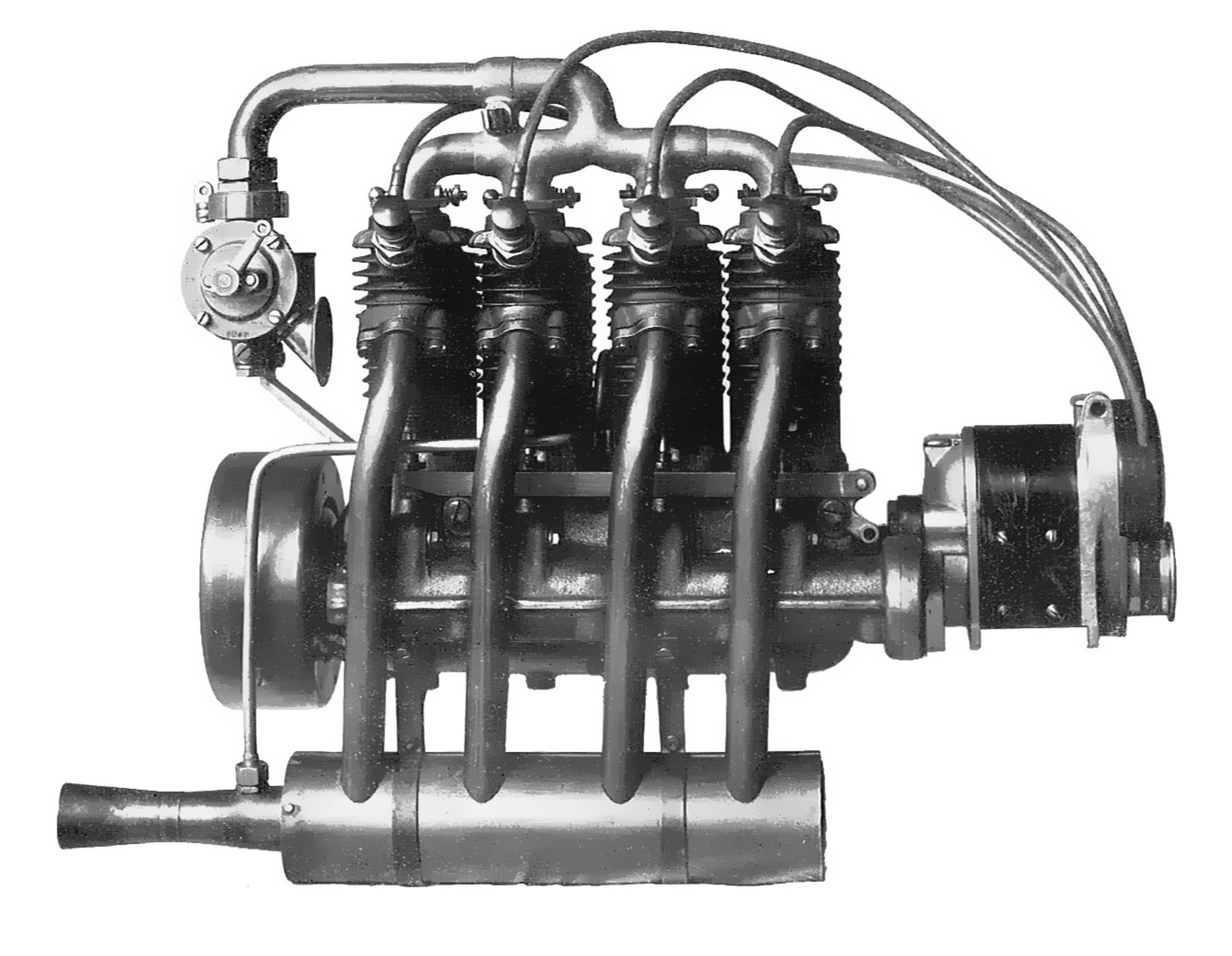
FN Intake-over-exhaust four-cylinder motor c. 1911

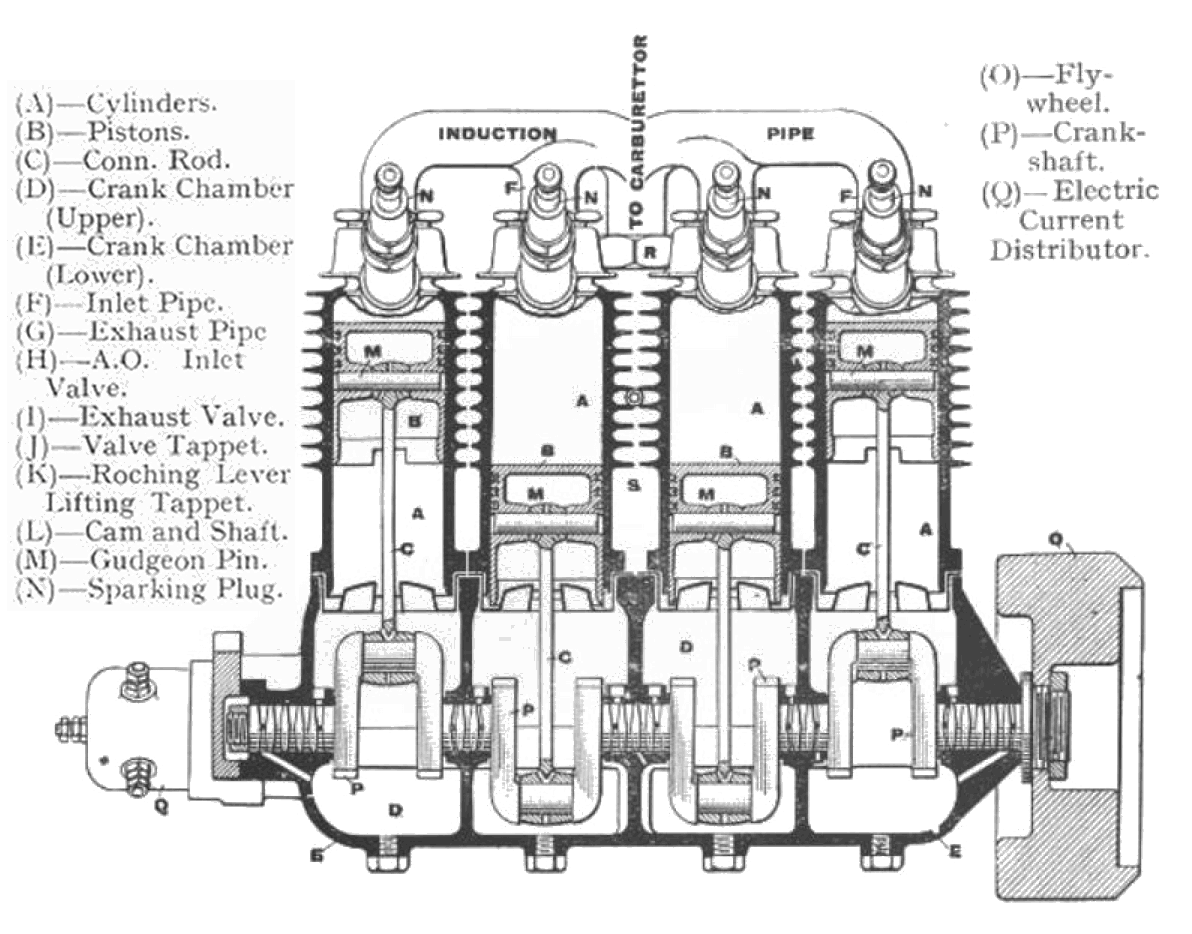
Sectional elevation of engine.

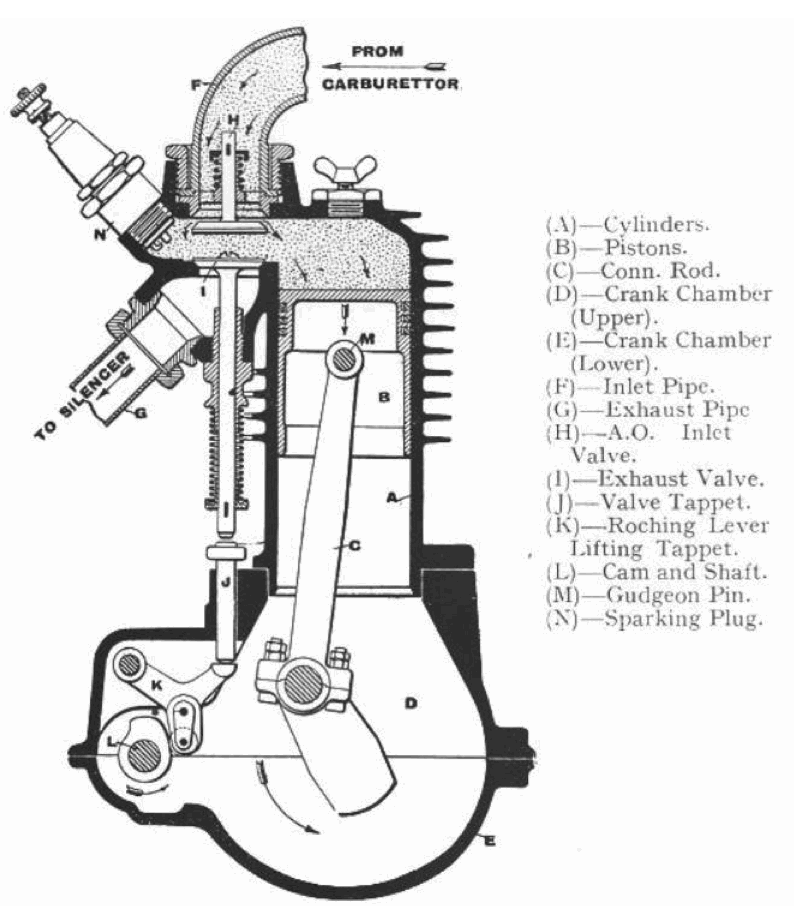
End section showing inlet over exhaust valves and atmospheric intake.

The FN Four's engine was designed by Paul Kelecom, who had designed single-cylinder engines prior to the FN. The air-cooled longitudinal layout was prone to overheating the rear cylinders, a trait overcome in later designs with water cooling and transverse layout.

FN originally fitted the Four with a 350 cc or 362 cc engine. The displacement increased over time, to 410 cc in 1906, later to 498 cc for the US market, and a 748 cc variant was produced in 1914. The engine had to be periodically oiled with a hand pump during riding. The intake valves were atmospheric, pushed open by ambient air pressure against light springs during the piston's intake stroke, up to the 1914 748 cc model, which replaced the automatic inlet valves with mechanically actuated side valves.

==== First four-cylinder motorcycle? ====
[A]lthough there were four-cylinder motorcycles prior to the FN, none came near matching the eminently successful and practical performance of the FN right from the beginning.

— T.A. Hodgdon, Motorcycling's Golden Age of the Fours, 1976

The FN Four was the first production inline-four, but not the first motorcycle with a four-cylinder engine. It was preceded by a boxer 4 manufactured in 1897 by Henry Capel Lofft Holden, and an obscure air-cooled inline-four developed in 1903 by C. Binks of Nottingham, England, but never produced commercially. A longitudinally mounted four-cylinder "model CCCC" prototype was created by Laurin & Klement and shown in Paris in 1904, but it was essentially four ganged single-cylinder engines with four separate crankshafts, not an inline-four in the modern sense. The FN, at the time of its introduction, was the only four-cylinder motorcycle for sale in America. (later Henderson Motorcycle sold a four from 1912 until 1931.)

==== Comparable motorcycles ====
- Henderson Four
- Indian Four
- Pierce Four
- Wilkinson TMC

== Specifications ==
Model year	Model name	Displacement	Power	Transmission	Brakes	Wheelbase	Dry weight
1905	FN Four	362 cc (22.1 cu in)	3.45 hp (2.57 kW) @ 1800 rpm	1-speed w/pedal start	Rear rim and coaster		165 lb (75 kg)
1906		412 cc (25.1 cu in)	4 1/2 hp (3.4 kW)	1-speed w/pedal start	Rear rim and coaster		
1908 1/2	Big Four		5 hp (3.7 kW)	1- or 2-speed w/pedal start	Rear rim and coaster		
1909			6 hp (4.5 kW)	1- or 2-speed w/pedal start	Rear: drum		
1910		498 cc (30.4 cu in)		1- or 2-speed w/pedal start	Rear: drum		165 lb (75 kg)
1911			6 hp (4.5 kW)	2-speed w/pedal start	Rear: drum	56 in (1,400 mm)	185 lb (84 kg)
1913				2-speed w/kickstart	Rear: drum		
1914–1923	700	748 cc (45.6 cu in)		3-speed	Rear: drum		

== Legacy ==
The success of the FN Four directly led the US Pierce Four to use the same engine mounted longitudinally with a shaft drive. Pierce-Arrow's Percy Pierce brought a 1908 FN Four home from Europe to disassemble and study. Indian, Henderson and Cleveland fours were all said to have been inspired by the FN Four.

Early examples of the machine are rare; a 1904/1905 model, reported to be the earliest known example, sold at a record price in a 2006 auction for over US$100,000.

=== Race history ===
A FN Four took third place in the 1908 Isle of Man TT, and was the first four-cylinder-engine vehicle entered at the Isle of Man TT. In 1908 another FN Four took the gold medal in a Motor Cycling Club endurance race on the 1,400-kilometre (870 mi) London–Edinburgh–London course.

=== Museum exhibits ===
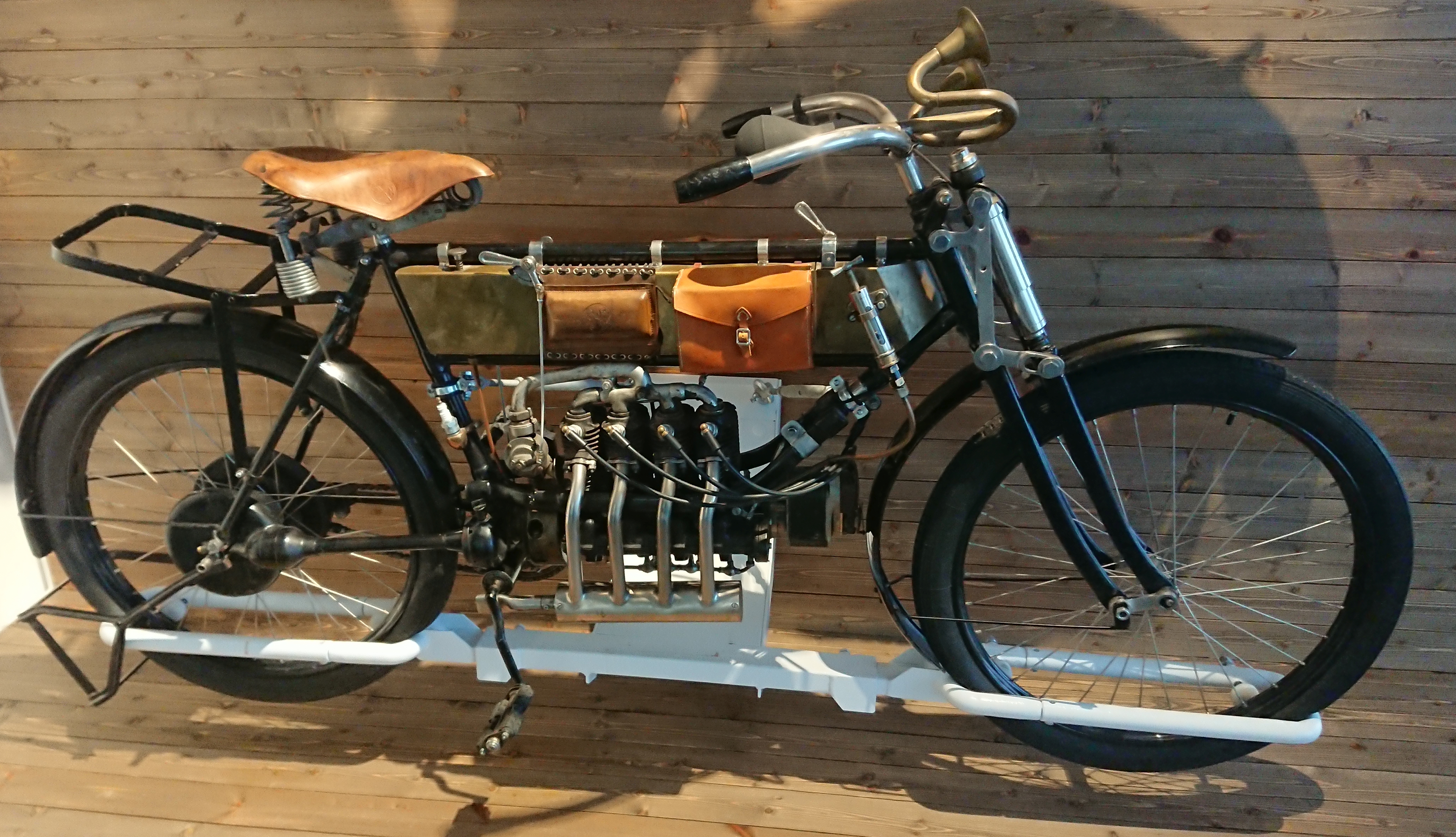
FN Four in UMMC museum, Russia

An FN Four was exhibited at the Guggenheim Museum's The Art of the Motorcycle exhibition in New York and Las Vegas. Models are in the permanent collections of Petersen Automotive Museum in Los Angeles, Seal Cove Auto Museum in Seal Cove, Maine, the Musée de la moto et du vélo in Amnéville France, and others.

== See also ==
- List of motorcycles of the 1910s
- List of motorcycles of 1900 to 1909

== Notes ==
Records
Preceded by Werner New Werner	Fastest production motorcycle 1911–1912	Succeeded by Scott two speed
