= Pierce Four =

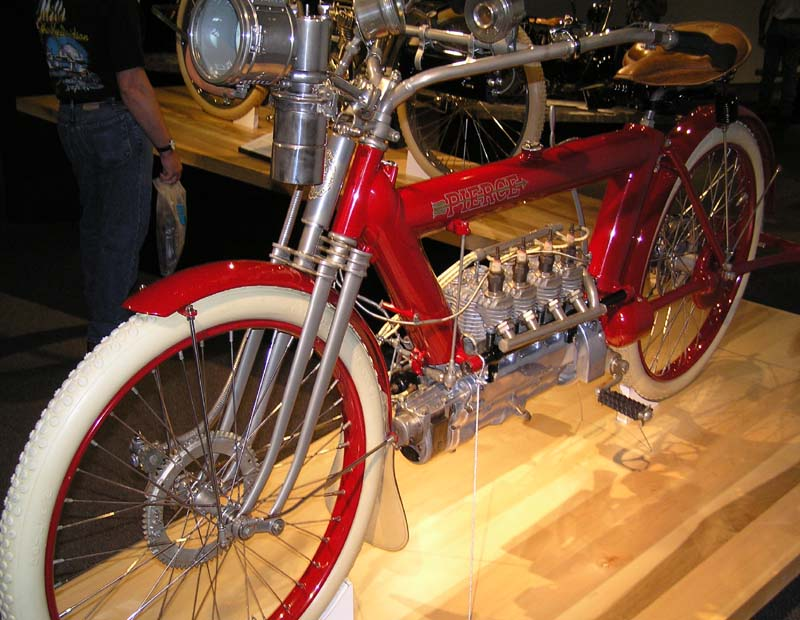
- Pierce Four at The Art of the Motorcycle exhibit in Memphis
- Manufacturer: Pierce Motorcycle Company
- Parent company: Pierce-Arrow Motor Car Company
- Production: 1909–1914
- Engine: 696 cc T-head inline-4 with compression release
- Bore / stroke: 2-1/2 x 2-1/2 in.
- Top speed: 60 mph (97 km/h)
- Power: 4 hp or 7 hp
- Transmission: Shaft drive
- Frame type: 3 1/2 inch tubing
- Suspension: Front: Leading link fork Rear: rigid
- Tires: 28×2.5 in. pneumatic
- Weight: 275 lb (125 kg) (dry)
- Related: FN Four, Henderson Four

The Pierce Four was the first four-cylinder motorcycle produced in the United States. The model is included in the AMA Motorcycle Hall of Fame Classic Bikes and Barber Vintage Motorsports Museum. Touting its inline-four engine as "vibrationless", Pierce sold the motorcycle for $325, rising to $400 by 1913, which was expensive at the time, making it popular with "more prosperous sportsmen".

== Development and design ==
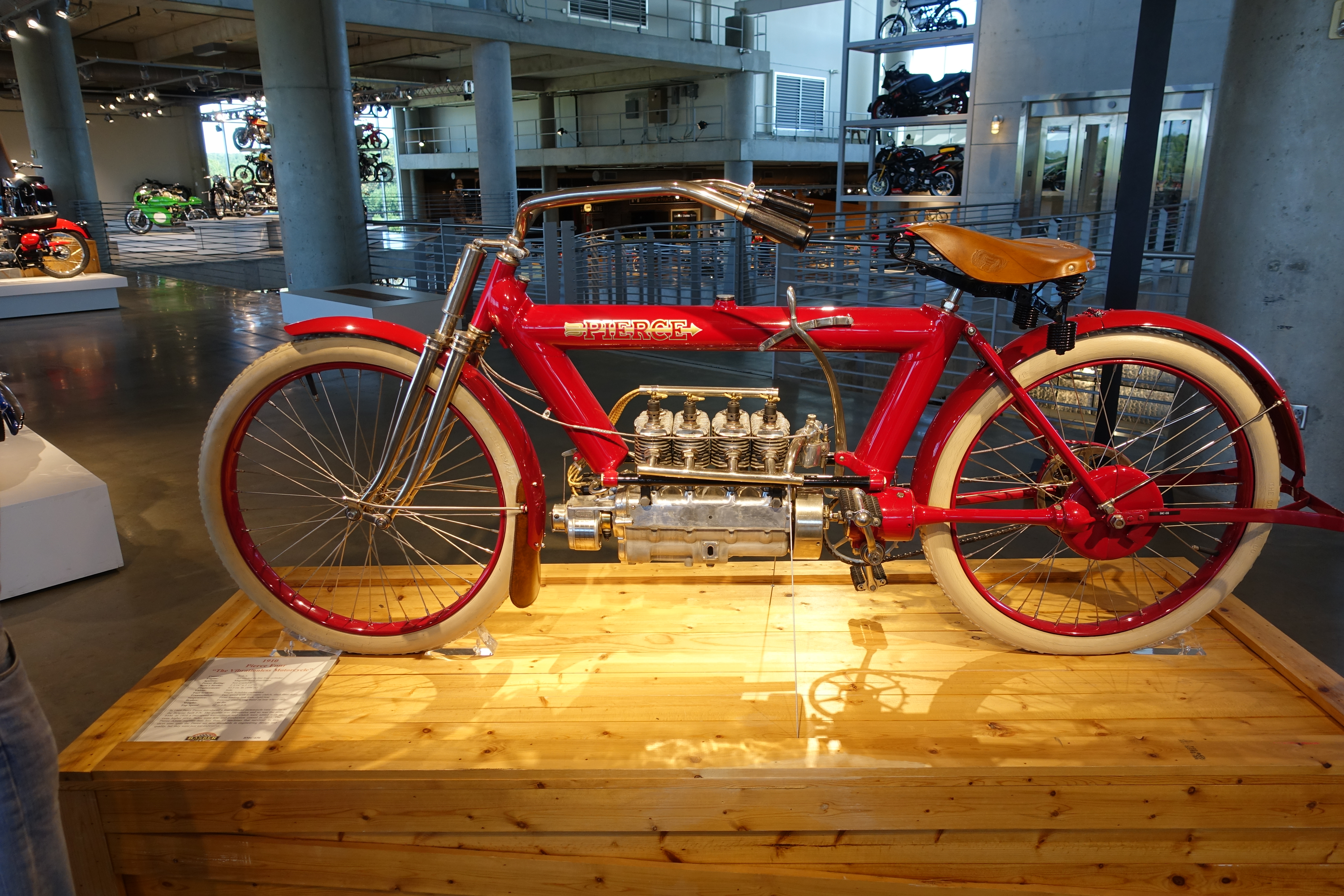
1910 Pierce Four motorcycle on display at the Barber Vintage Motorsports Museum, Birmingham, Alabama.

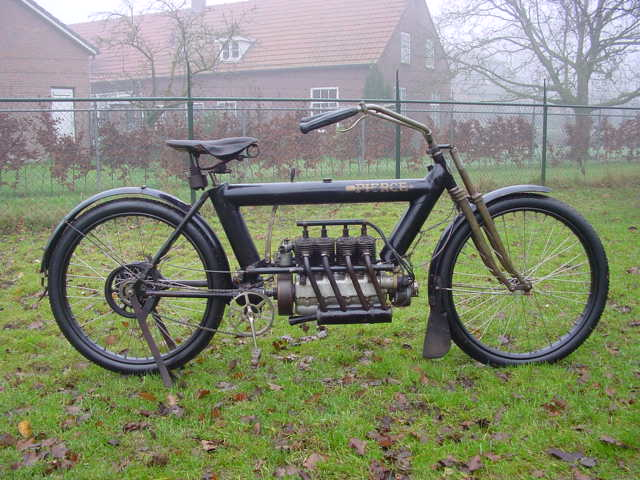
1911 Pierce Motorcycle

George N. Pierce, owner of the GN Pierce Company, built refrigerators and bird cages in the 1890s, and expanded into bicycle manufacture by 1892, with the famous 'arrow' logo. Many of their bicycles used a shaft drive for the rear wheel. Three members of the GN Pierce board of directors traveled to Europe in 1900 to acquire new technology, and they purchased a DeDion engine to power a new automobile.

Pierce's son Percy was a competition driver of Pierce automobiles. By 1907, he was appointed head of the new Pierce Cycle Company, with the intention of producing motorcycles. Following factory tradition, he traveled to Europe for technical inspiration and acquired a Belgian FN Four in 1908, which was shipped back to the Pierce factory for study. As the world's first production four-cylinder motorcycle, the FN was the apex of current technology, and the Pierce engineering team used the FN as a reference for their own four-cylinder motorcycle introduced in 1909: the Pierce Four.

The new Pierce was innovative, with a stressed member engine and shaft drive, and a frame of very large-diameter tubing, that both hid the control cables and held oil and gasoline internally. The large diameter tubing is said to have increased the frame's strength, and reduced the number of parts required, making manufacture less expensive. Unlike FN's engine, the Pierce had a T-head sidevalve motor, and cam-driven intake valves rather than the 'automatic' (opened by atmospheric pressure) inlet valves of the FN. The Pierce was thus quite an improvement on the FN, and was the first four-cylinder motorcycle manufactured in the USA. Early models had no clutch and fixed gearing, like the competing FN Four, but the 1910 model was greatly improved, with a clutch and two-speed transmission.

== Fate of Pierce Motorcycle Company ==
The motorcycle is said to have cost more to build than its sale price and eventually bankrupted Pierce Motorcycle Company after fewer than 500 were built.

== Exhibitions and collections ==
The Pierce Four was exhibited in the Guggenheim Museum's The Art of the Motorcycle exhibition in Las Vegas. Examples are held in permanent collections of several museums, including the National Motorcycle Museum in Iowa, the Motorcycle Hall of Fame Museum in Ohio, the Barber Vintage Motorsports Museum in Alabama, Sammy Miller Motorcycle Museum in England and the Dreamcycle Motorcycle Museum in Sorrento, British Columbia.

== See also ==
- List of motorcycles of 1900 to 1909
- List of motorcycles of the 1910s
- List of motorcycles by type of engine
- Indian Four
