= Hildebrand & Wolfmüller =

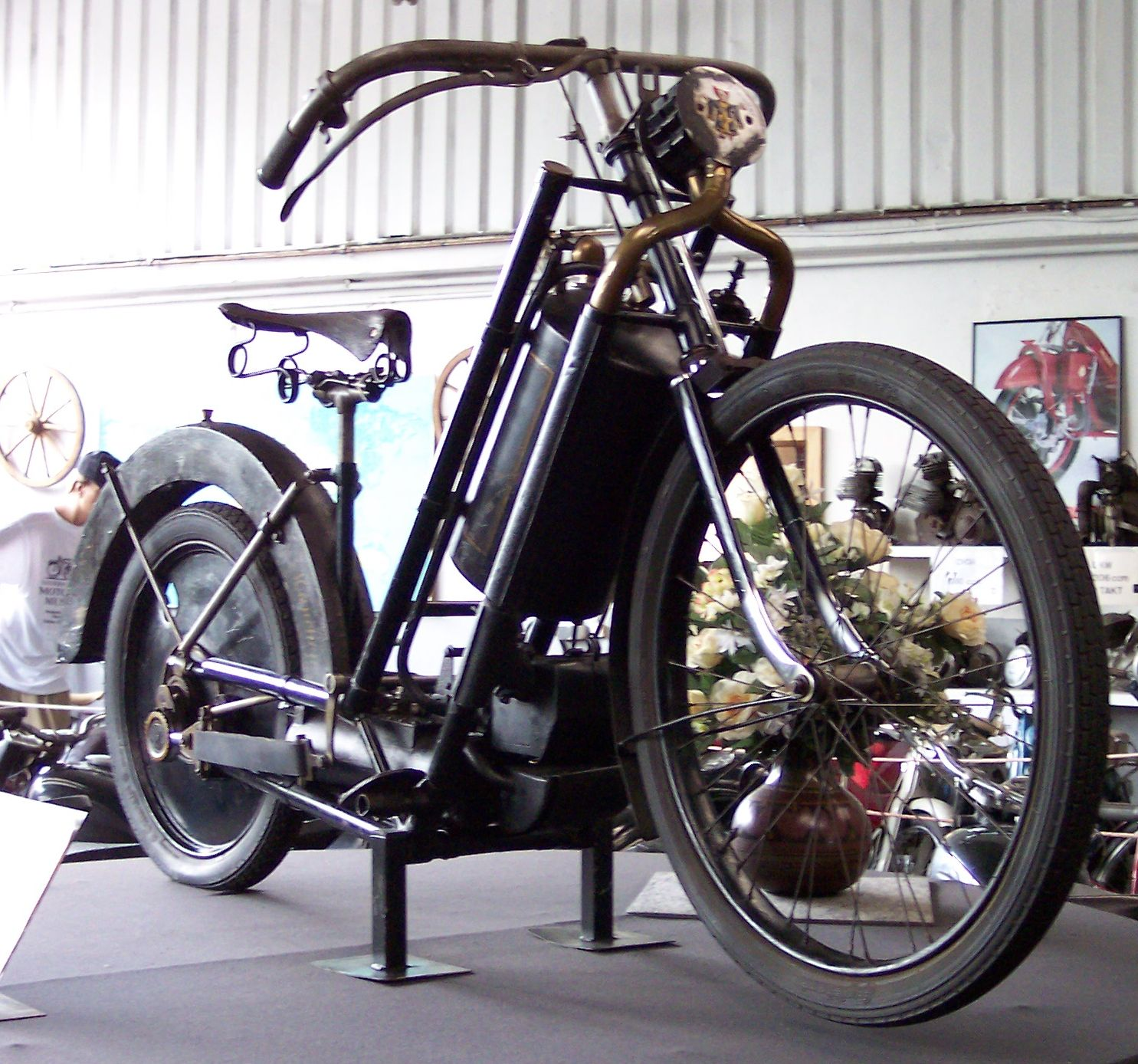
- Manufacturer: Heinrich Hildebrand, Wilhelm Hildebrand & Alois Wolfmüller
- Production: 1894–1897
- Engine: 1,489 cc (90.9 cu in) 360° two-cylinder water-cooled four-stroke, with surface carburetor
- Bore / stroke: 90 mm × 117 mm (3.5 in × 4.6 in)
- Top speed: 28 mph (45 km/h)
- Power: 2.5 bhp (1.9 kW) @ 240 rpm
- Ignition type: Hot tube
- Transmission: Direct drive via connecting rods
- Frame type: Steel tubular duplex, step-through
- Brakes: spoon brake, friction against front tire
- Tires: pneumatic, front 26 in (66 cm), rear 22 in (56 cm)
- Weight: 110 lb (50 kg) (dry)

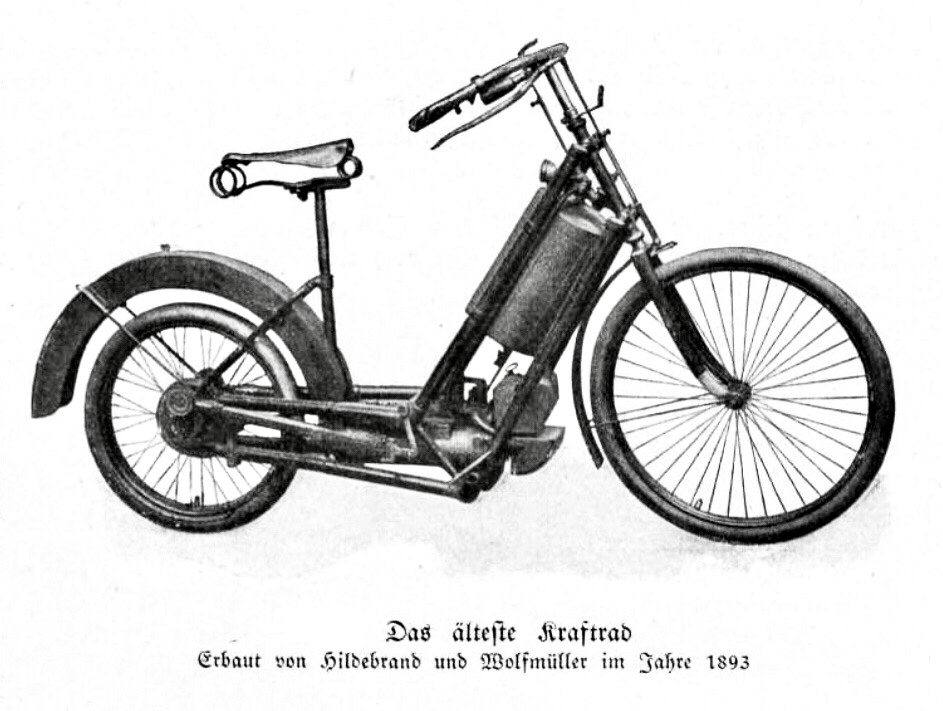
Hildebrand & Wolfmüller (1893)

The Hildebrand & Wolfmüller was the world's first production motorcycle. Heinrich and Wilhelm Hildebrand were steam-engine engineers before they teamed up with Alois Wolfmüller to produce their internal combustion Motorrad in Munich in 1894.

== Mechanical details ==
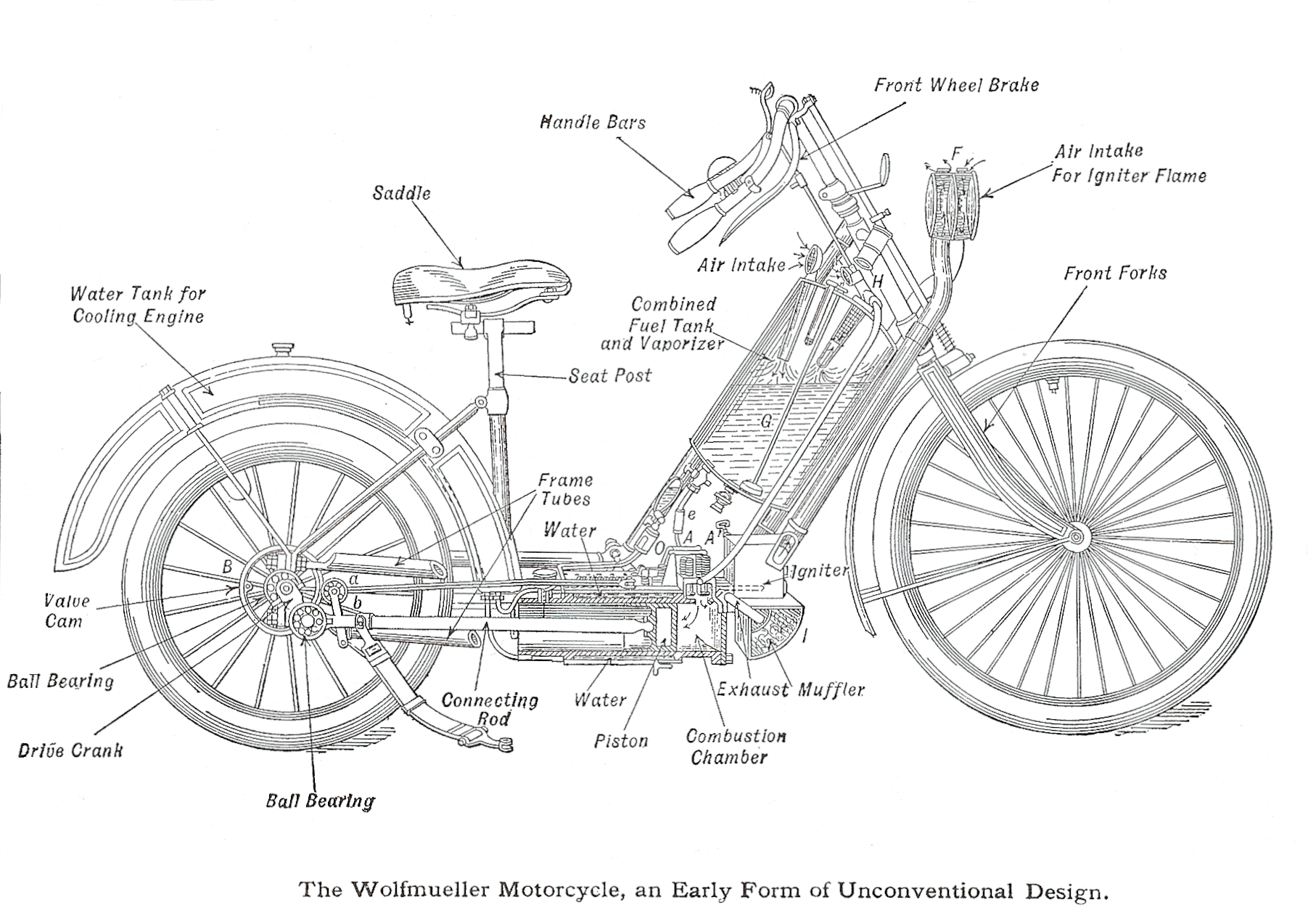
Diagram of 1894 Hildebrand & Wolfmüller.

The Hildebrand & Wolfmüller patent of 20 January 1894, No. 78553 describes a 1,489 cc (90.9 cu in) two-cylinder, four-stroke engine, with a bore and stroke of 90 mm × 117 mm (3.5 in × 4.6 in). It produced 1.9 kW (2.5 bhp) @ 240 rpm propelling a weight of 50 kg (110 lb) up to a maximum speed of 45 km/h (28 mph).The fuel-air mixture from the surface carburettor was regulated by a valve operated by controls on the handlebar. The engine, which was positioned flat in the frame, used hot tube ignition with the tube heater in front of the cylinder heads. The tube heater was ventilated by the lower downtubes while the upper downtubes held lubricating oil.

Some design details were carried over from a steam-powered prototype made by the Hildebrand brothers in 1889, including the water tank shaped to form the rear mudguard and the connecting rods of the engine driving the rear wheel directly. The water tank was repurposed to supply water to the cooling jackets surrounding the cylinders. The steam-powered prototype had a double-acting cylinder, applying power to the piston in both directions. With no double action available in the petrol engine, and no flywheel effect apart from the movement of the rear wheel, the return impulse for the piston was provided by heavy rubber bands.

The intake valves were operated by the suction caused by the intake stroke, while the exhaust valves were operated by an eccentric brass ring on the rear wheel and a device at the cylinder head that opened each cylinder's valve alternately.

== Production run ==
Approximately two thousand examples of the motorcycle were built, but with a high initial purchase price and increasing competition from improving designs (this model was entirely "run and jump" with neither clutch nor pedals) it is not thought to have been a great commercial success. The Hildebrand & Wolfmüller factory closed in 1919 after the First World War. The motorcycle was also built under licence in Paris by Duncan and Superbie.

== Survivors ==
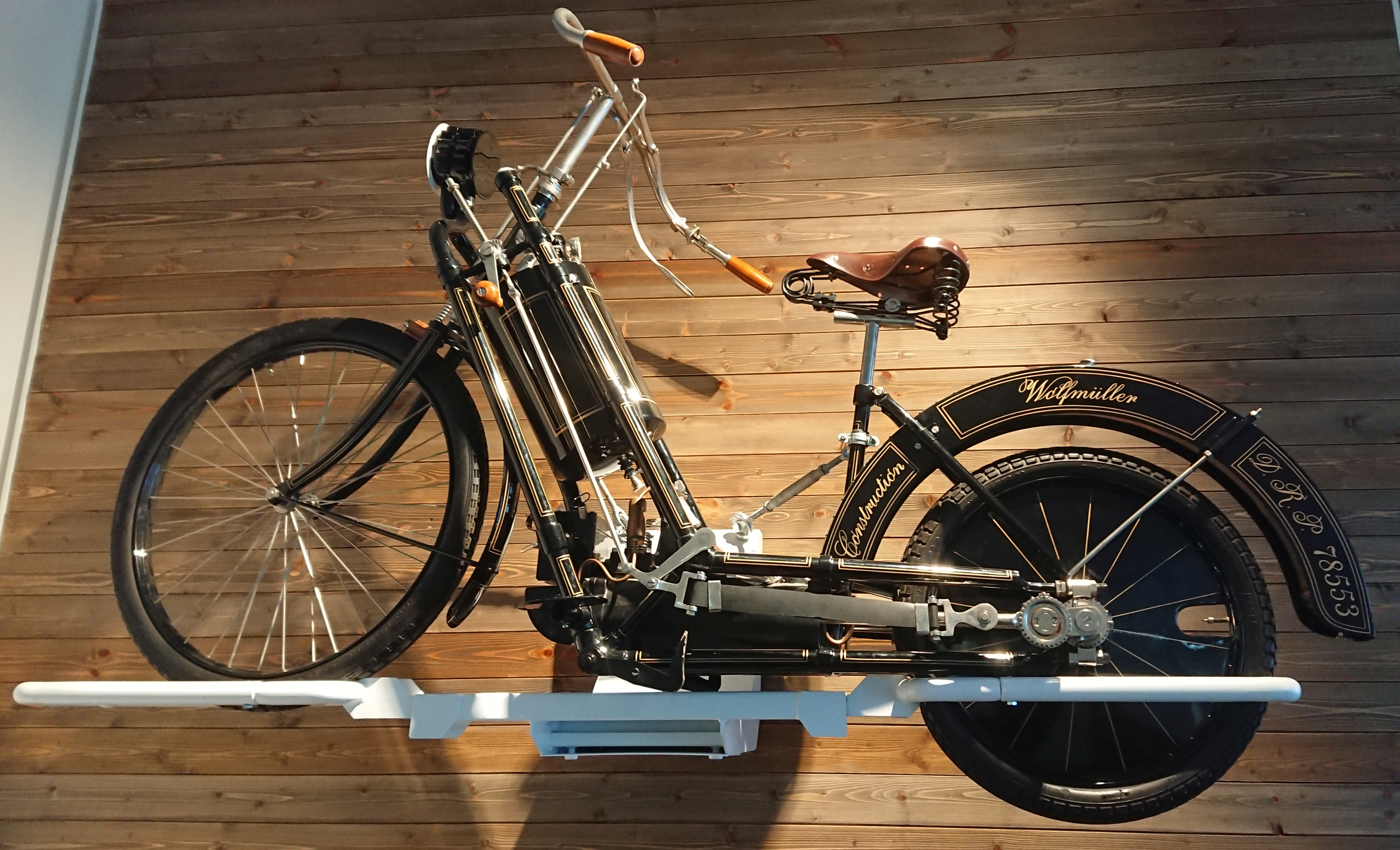
Hildebrand & Wolfmuller in Museum UMMC (Russia, Sverdlovsk region, Verkhnyaya Pyshma)

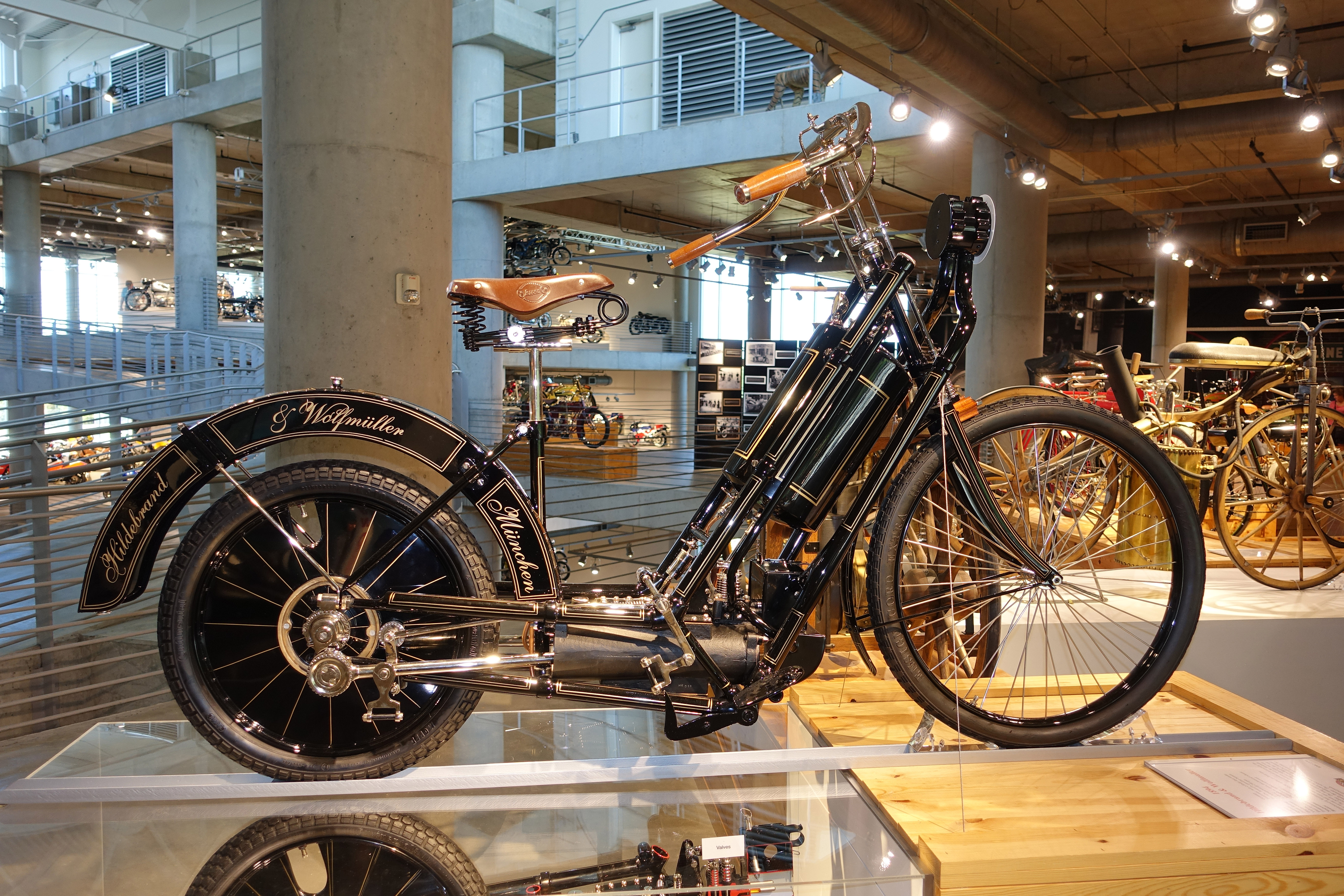
1894 Hildebrand and Wolfmüller motorcycle on display at the Barber Vintage Motorsports Museum, Birmingham, Alabama.

Examples exist today in the Deutsches Zweirad- und NSU-Museum in Neckarsulm, Germany, the Science Museum in London, The Henry Ford in Detroit, Michigan, the Museum Lalu Lintas in Surabaya, Indonesia, National Technical Museum in Prague, and the Barber Vintage Motorsports Museum in Birmingham, Alabama, USA. Until 2011, the Wells Auto Museum in Wells, Maine listed an 1894 Wolfmüller in their collection.

== See also ==
- List of motorcycles of the 1890s

Records
Preceded by None	Fastest production motorcycle 1894–1901	Succeeded by Werner New Werner
