= Advance (Australian motorcycle) =

IJ Mitchell of Blyth, South Australia advertised Advance motorcycles built to order in 1905–06. At least one machine was registered.

== See also ==
- List of motorcycles of 1900 to 1909
