= New Werner =

Motorcycle

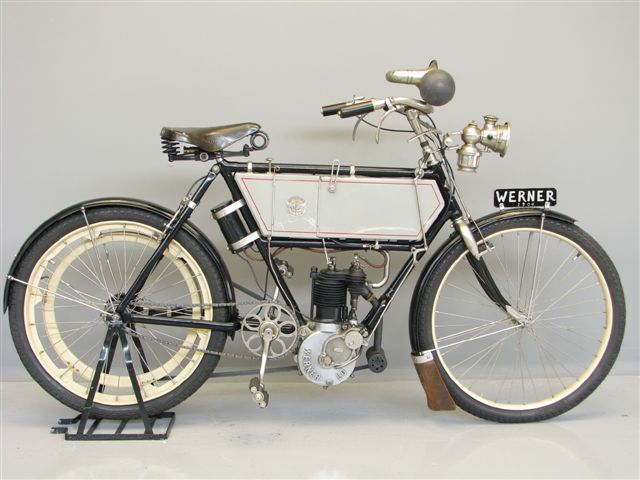
- 1904 Werner
- Manufacturer: Werner Motors
- Production: 1901–1908
- Predecessor: Werner 1897 "Motocyclette"
- Engine: 217 cc single-cylinder, four-stroke, surface carburetor
- Bore / stroke: 62 × 72 mm
- Power: 1.5 hp (1.1 kW)
- Ignition type: Platinum hot tube ignition or battery and trembler coil
- Transmission: Rawhide belt drive
- Weight: c. 100 lb (45 kg) (dry)

The New Werner was a motorcycle produced by Werner Motors beginning in 1901. It replaced Werner's 1897 model, whose motor placed above the front wheel caused handling problems. Production ceased in 1908. Some 50, now known as the "Leitner Rossiya Motorcycle", were also produced under license in Russia with Fafnir engines at the Riga bicycle works.

The New Werner's lasting innovation was to place the engine at the lowest point in a bicycle-style diamond frame, where a bicycle crank would have been (the bicycle pedals, crank and redundant chain were relocated rearward and retained for starting and hillclimbing assistance). The pattern of low-mounted engine inside some kind of motorcycle frame became the standard motorcycle layout for the 20th century.

The intake valve was automatic (actuated by atmospheric pressure) and the exhaust valve was cam driven.

At 30 miles per hour (48 km/h), it was the fastest production motorcycle from the time it was introduced until the 1911 model year FN Four was introduced.

The New Werner was selected by Cycle World's Kevin Cameron as the most influential motorcycle of all time. It was shown in the Guggenheim Museum's 2001–2003 The Art of the Motorcycle exhibition in Las Vegas.

== See also ==
- List of motorcycles of 1900 to 1909

Records
Preceded by Hildebrand & Wolfmüller	Fastest production motorcycle 1901–1911	Succeeded by FN Four
