= FN (automobile) =

Belgian motor vehicle manufacturer

The Belgian Fabrique Nationale d’Armes de Guerre (National Manufacturer of War Weapons) company, also sometimes known as Fabrique Nationale de Herstal (National Manufacturer at Herstal), but better known simply as "FN" or "Fabrique Nationale", was founded at Herstal on the edge of Liège in 1889. As well as weapons, it was for many years a maker of motorcycles and of automobiles.

This article is about the automobiles. FN made automobiles from 1899 until the late 1930s, which makes it Belgium's longest-lived make of car.

== History ==
Despite state-of-the-art manufacturing capabilities, by the end of 1895 FN was in poor financial shape, due to a lack of orders for its M1889 rifle, and a lost legal battle with Mauser over the rights to produce the improved M1893. In 1896, most of their primary shareholders left and a major competitor, DWM, took over a controlling stake, excluding the company from the export market for military firearms and forcing it to diversify into sporting firearms, their parts, and even bicycles. In 1897 their sales manager Hart O. Berg visited Pope Manufacturing Company and by 1898 FN bought a Columbia Victoria battery electric vehicle.

The first FN automobile prototype was built in March 1899, and its serial production started in 1900. It was called a "Spider", but to modern eyes more closely resembles a horseless carriage. It has a two cylinder engine, which drove the rear wheels via a chain. A car with a four cylinder, four-litre engine followed in 1904, with a claimed power output of 14 PS (10 kW). This car already included an angled steering column. The next year saw the arrival of the more luxurious FN Typ 30-40. Customers included members of the Belgian Royal family and the Shah of Persia.

Th FN 6900 was developed from the Typ 30-40, powered by an engine built under licence from Rochet-Schneider. Its cylinders were cast in pairs. Drive to the rear axle was via a disc clutch and a steel drive-shaft. The car was designed for comfort, with suspension that used both laterally and longitudinally-mounted leaf springs.

With the FN Typ 2000, the car also gained flexible engine mountings. This was followed by the Typ 2700 which, for the first time, was powered by an engine designed and built by FN itself.

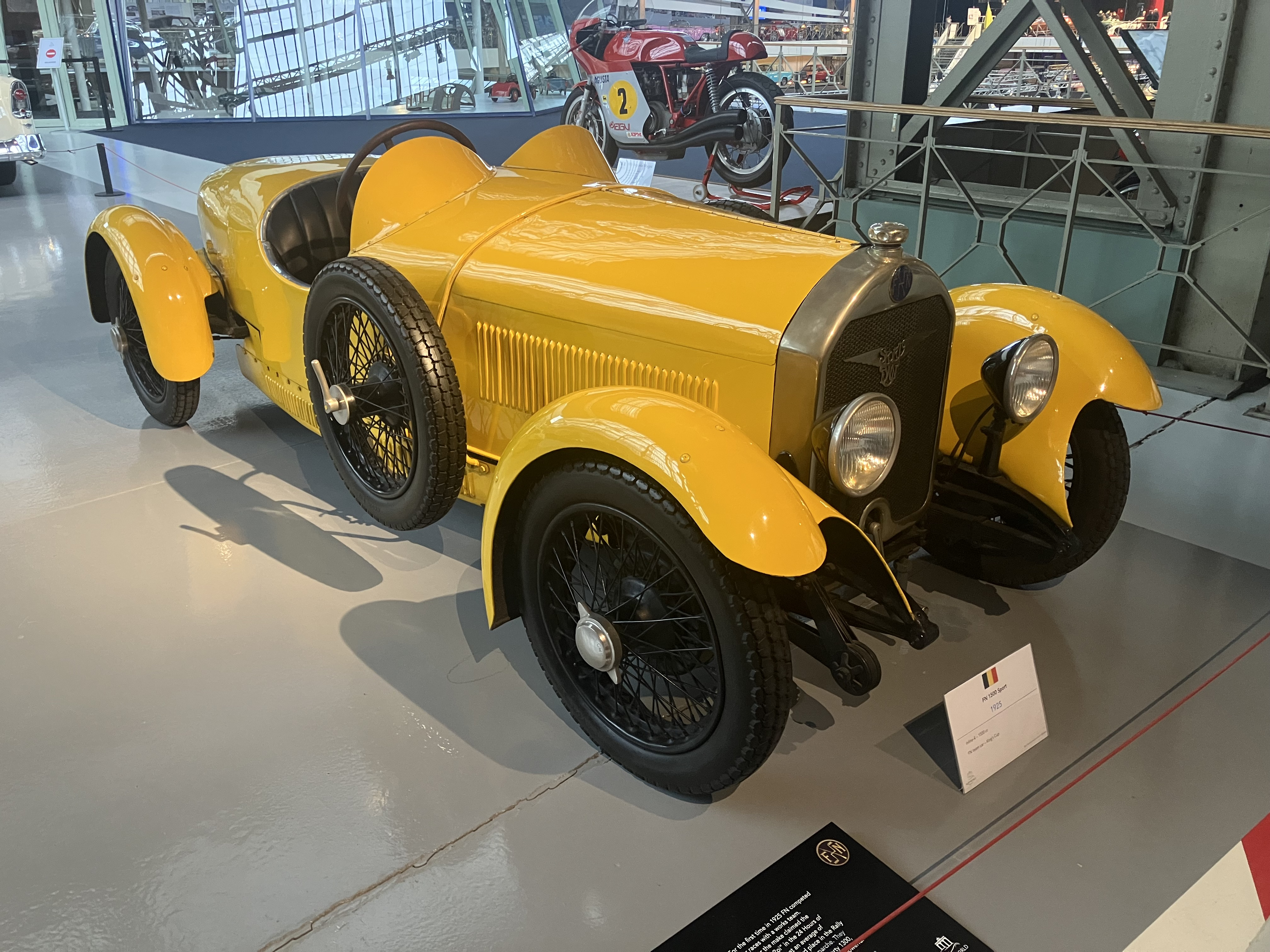
1925 FN 1300 S Sport

Automobile production resumed after the First World War, and the Typ 2700a was now equipped with an electric starter, a tachometer and "automatic" chassis lubrication. The engine was built largely of aluminium. Further model introductions were the FN Typ 1950; the improved FN Typ 1250A; and, later, the FN 1250T, with a fully functioning electrical system, a four cylinder engine rated at 15 CV, and a three speed transmission.

The FN Typ 1250 was followed by the FN Typ 1300, available in 3 different versions designated "A", "B", and "C". Technically all were identical, but with differing wheelbases and equipment levels. They were powered by a 4-cylinder 1327 cm³ engine with a side-mounted camshaft and overhead valves. The cars were delivered with wide low-pressure "balloon" tyres, and four-wheel brakes. The range was later broadened with the arrival of the FN Typ 1300D, with four speed transmission; followed by the Typ 1300E, with a widened track; and the FN Typ 1300Sp developed for sports driving. The model was very successful.

The FN Typ 2150 was, by the standards of the time and place, a mid-range automobile with a four cylinder engine of about 1.5 litres and four speed transmission. At the top of the range came the FN Typ 3800, which was produced in only very small numbers. However, a strengthened Typ 3800 chassis formed the basis of a small truck.

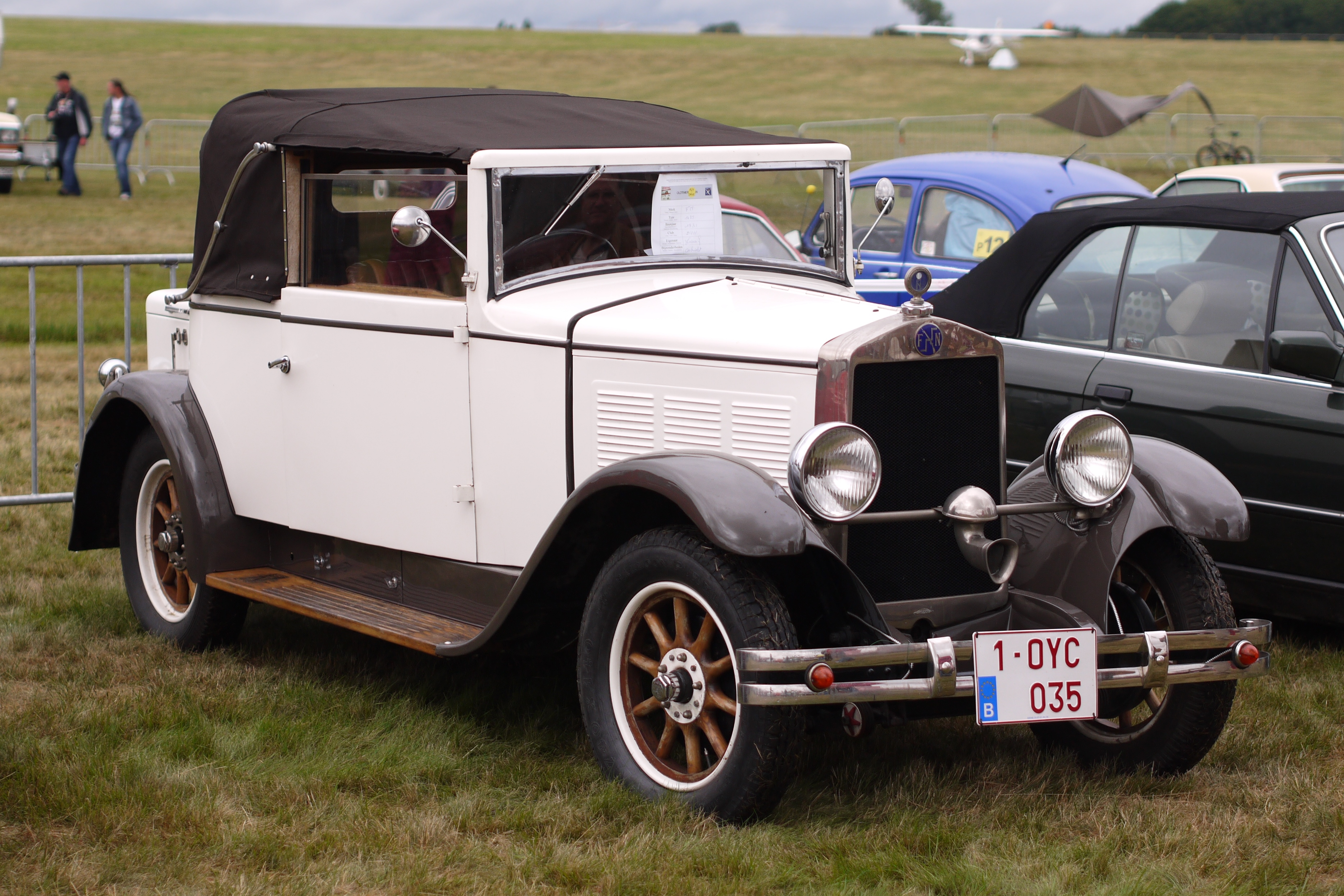
FN 11CV 1625 cabriolet (1931)

1927 saw the launch of the FN 10CV, which was built for three years. It was replaced in 1930, amidst celebration of the manufacturer's first thirty years as an auto-maker, by the FN 11CV, a technically well-equipped car, noted for its sporty driving characteristics. A delivery van based on the 11CV was also available. Higher up in the hierarchy of the market place, FN were also at this time offering a prestigious eight cylinder car.

The successor to the FN 11CV appeared in 1931 in the form of the FN 11CV 1625 which, despite still being within the same 11CV car tax band, had a larger engine. By the start of the 1930s, FN was making 16 different models, which led to economic difficulties. Therefore, from 1930, only two new models were built. These were named after King Albert's eldest grandson, and his baby brother: the "FN Prince Baudouin" und the "FN Prince Albert". The two cars share the same 11CV engine, but have different bodywork.

== Vehicle manufacturing after the end of passenger car production ==
After passenger car production came to an end, the company continued to make FN motorcycles until the mid 1960s. Commercial vehicle production also continued till after the Second World War, and FN was building trolleybuses until the early 1960s.

== See also ==
- FN (motorcycle)
- FN Herstal
