= Werner Motors =

Werner Brothers
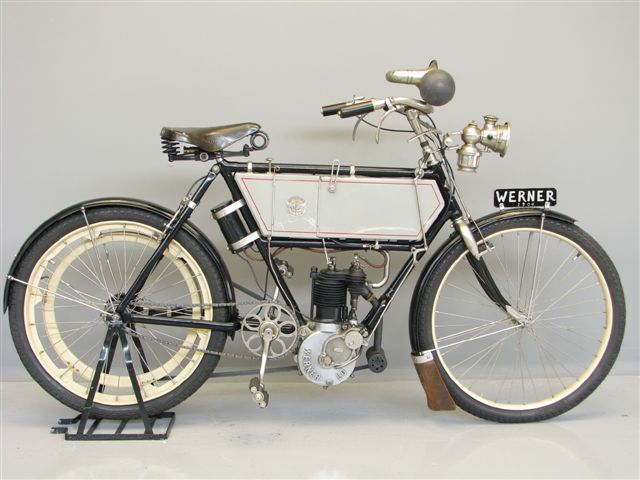
- The Werner Brothers Motobicyclette of 1904
- Manufacturer: Werner Frères et Cie
- Production: Paris, France, 1898 MMC England
- Engine: 216 cc (13.2 cu in), air-cooled, four-stroke, single-cylinder
- Fuel capacity: Fuel was of 0.680 specific gravity

The Werner Brothers, Michel and Eugene, were of French nationality but were originally from Russia. They started to experiment with motorized bicycles (Moto Bicyclette) in 1896 and are credited with the first use of the word "Motocyclette" in 1897.

== History ==
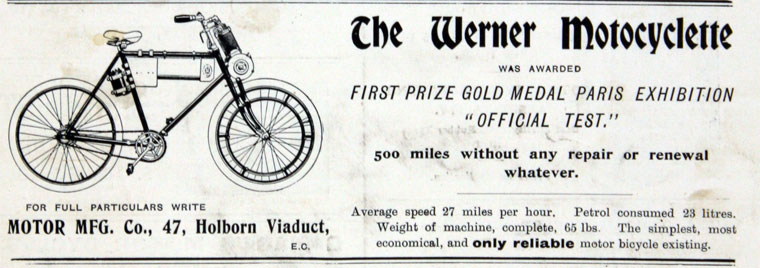
Motocyclette advertisement from 1900

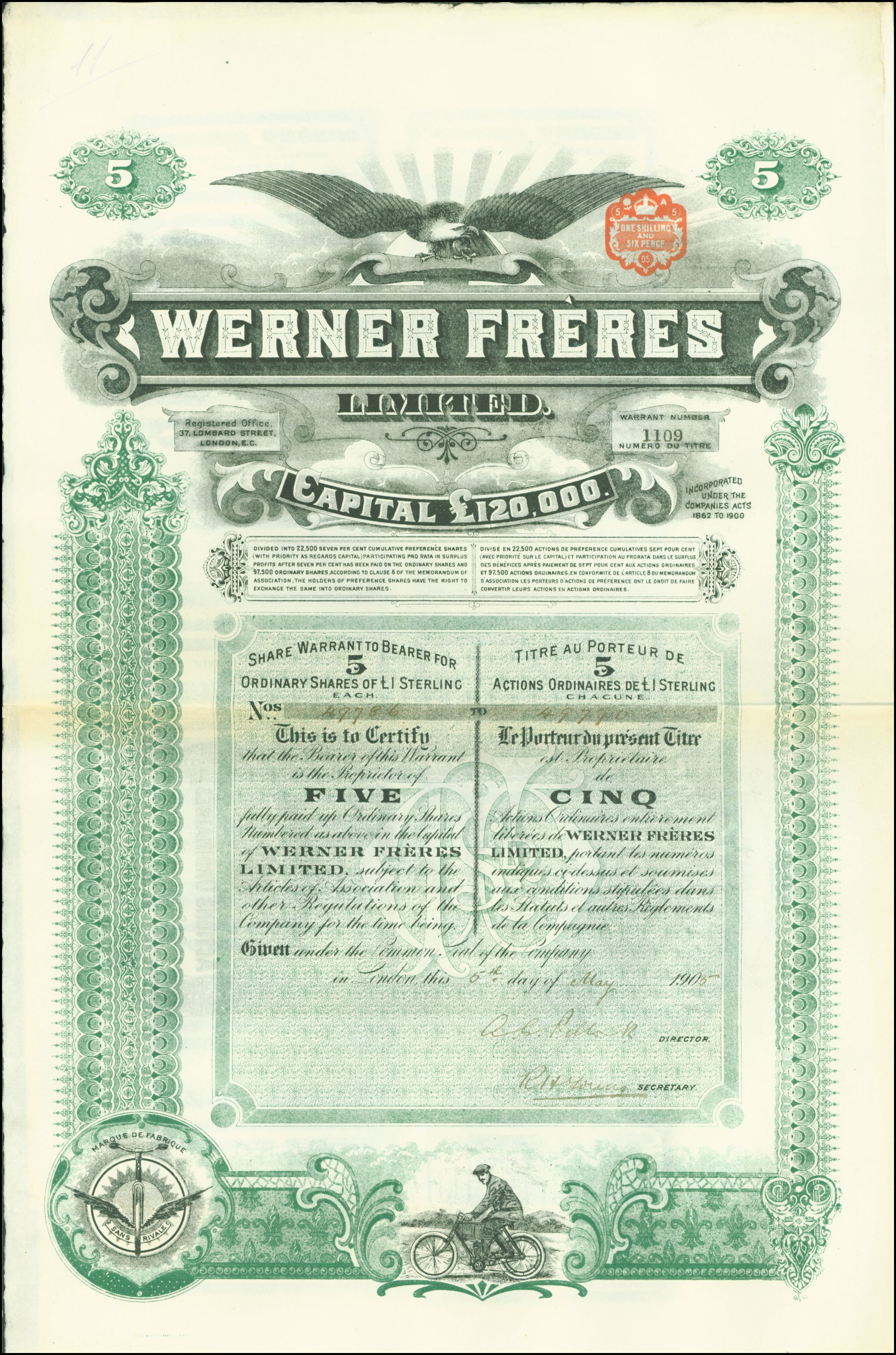
Share of the Werner Frères Ltd., issued 5. May 1905

The attempt to use a De Dion-Bouton engine in a bicycle frame in 1896 resulted in failure. But in 1897 they succeeded in creating a moto bicycle called the Motocyclette with the engine mounted on the front steering head that achieved some success.

The most significant success in moto bicycle design came in 1900 with the New Werner which used a patented frame design in which the engine is mounted at the bottom of the frame. By this time the company was also making their own engines rather than buying them from De Dion-Bouton as had been the case previously.

Werner was also the first or one of the first to produce a moto bicycle with a two-cylinder vertical twin engine in 1903 with a capacity of 500 cc.

Werner licensed Motor Manufacturing Company in England to sell their line of motorcycles.

When both brothers died, Michel in 1905 and Eugene in 1908 the company failed.

On 13 September 1902, Alfred Nipper of Prospect Place, Weston Super Mare, was riding his 1898 Werner Motorcycle on Bristol Road, Worle, Somerset when he was reported for the following offence as written on the summons.

"Then being the driver of a certain carriage (to wit a motorcycle) on a certain highway there situate called Bristol Road unlawfully did ride the same furiously thereon so as then to endanger the lives and limbs of passengers on the said highway"

This is believed to be the first summons issued in Somerset for a motoring offence. Mr Nipper was fined seven shillings and Six pence. The summons is now in the possession of Mr Nippers great nephew Laurie Hatchard of Kingsley Cheshire.

Alfred Nipper was a photographer, but he also assisted Marconi with his radio transmissions from Weston Super Mare.

== See also ==
- FN Four
- List of motorcycles of 1900 to 1909
