= FN M12 =

The FN M12 was a motorcycle manufactured from 1937 to 1940 by the Belgian company Fabrique Nationale de Herstal, primarily for use with a sidecar. 1,180 were built, 1,090 of which were delivered to the Belgian military as heavy sidecar combinations.

== Specifications ==
The twin-cylinder flathead piston engine of the M12 had 992 cc (60.5 cu in) displacement (90 mm bore, 78 mm stroke). With a compression ratio of 5:1, a 28mm Amal carburettor and Bosch battery ignition, nominal performance was 22 hp at 3000 rpm. Power was supplied to the rear wheel via a universal joint. The top speed of the 240 kg machine was 100 km/h (62 mph)

The military version with a sidecar (M12a SM) had a removable sidecar, a four-speed gearbox with reverse gear and reduction gears and separately operated drum brakes 220 mm in diameter. The FN M12a was introduced to the public in extensive use at an international military competition in July 1938 in Spa, Belgium. In 2012 an article in Motorrad Klassik described this combination as "vastly superior to all military motorcycles with sidecar".

The FN M12 engine was also used in the Tricar 12T-3 three-wheeler.

== Market ==
The military version was exported to: Iran (51), Greece (33) Argentina (4) Switzerland (4), Romania (4), Lithuania (3) and Peru (1). After the Battle of France in 1940, the German Wehrmacht also used captured FN M12a SM combinations; they could be distinguished from the German BMW R75 and Zündapp KS 750 combinations by the different girder fork. The Belgians were at the time dominant in the manufacture of sidecar machines; one captured FN M12a SM was studied and tested by Zündapp, and details of its construction were incorporated in the KS 750.
