= List of motorcycles of 1900 to 1909 =

List of motorcycles of the 1900s to 1909 is a listing of motorcycles of this period, including those on sale, introduced, or otherwise relevant in this period

== Motorcycle ==
- Achilles (1906-1912 motorcycle)
- Advance (Australian motorcycle)
- Curtiss V-8 motorcycle
- Excelsior Motor Manufacturing & Supply Company
- Merkel
- FN Four (various version produced, 1905–1923)
- Harley-Davidson prototype
- Harley-Davidson 1905 model
- Harley-Davidson 1907 "Strap-tank" model
- Harley-Davidson 1909 V-twin
- Indian Single (1903)
- Indian Twin (1908)
- Indian 1905 "camel-back" single (Hendee)
- Laurin & Klement motorcycles
- Laurin & Klement 1908 BZ
- Marks motorcycle (1896–1901)
- California Motor Co. motorcycle (1902–1904)
- Motosachoche A1
- New Werner (produced until 1908)
- NSU 3 hp (Neckarsulm: NSU Motorenwerke)
- Norton Big 4
- Perks & Birch Motor-wheel, Singer (1899–1904)
- Pierce Four
- Reading Standard (1909)
- Royal Pioneer (1909)
- Steffy Motor Bike (add-on kit bike)
- Thomas Auto-Bi
- Thor Model 7 (1908)
- Triumph-Motorrad motorcycle (1903)
- Yale-California motorcycles by Consolidated Manufacturing (1904–1906)
- Yale motorcycle by Consolidated Manufacturing (1906)

== Gallery ==
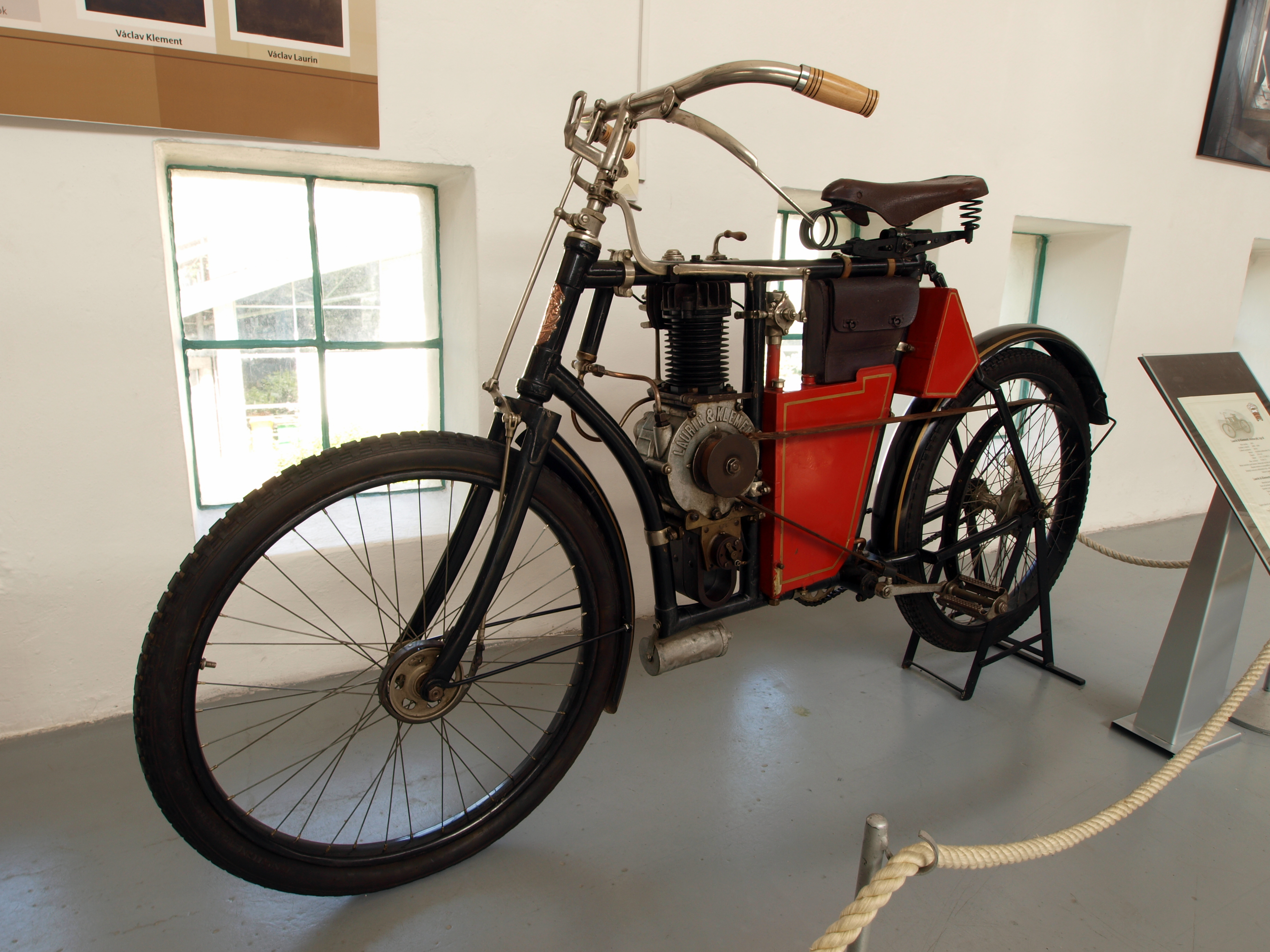
1903 Laurin & Klement

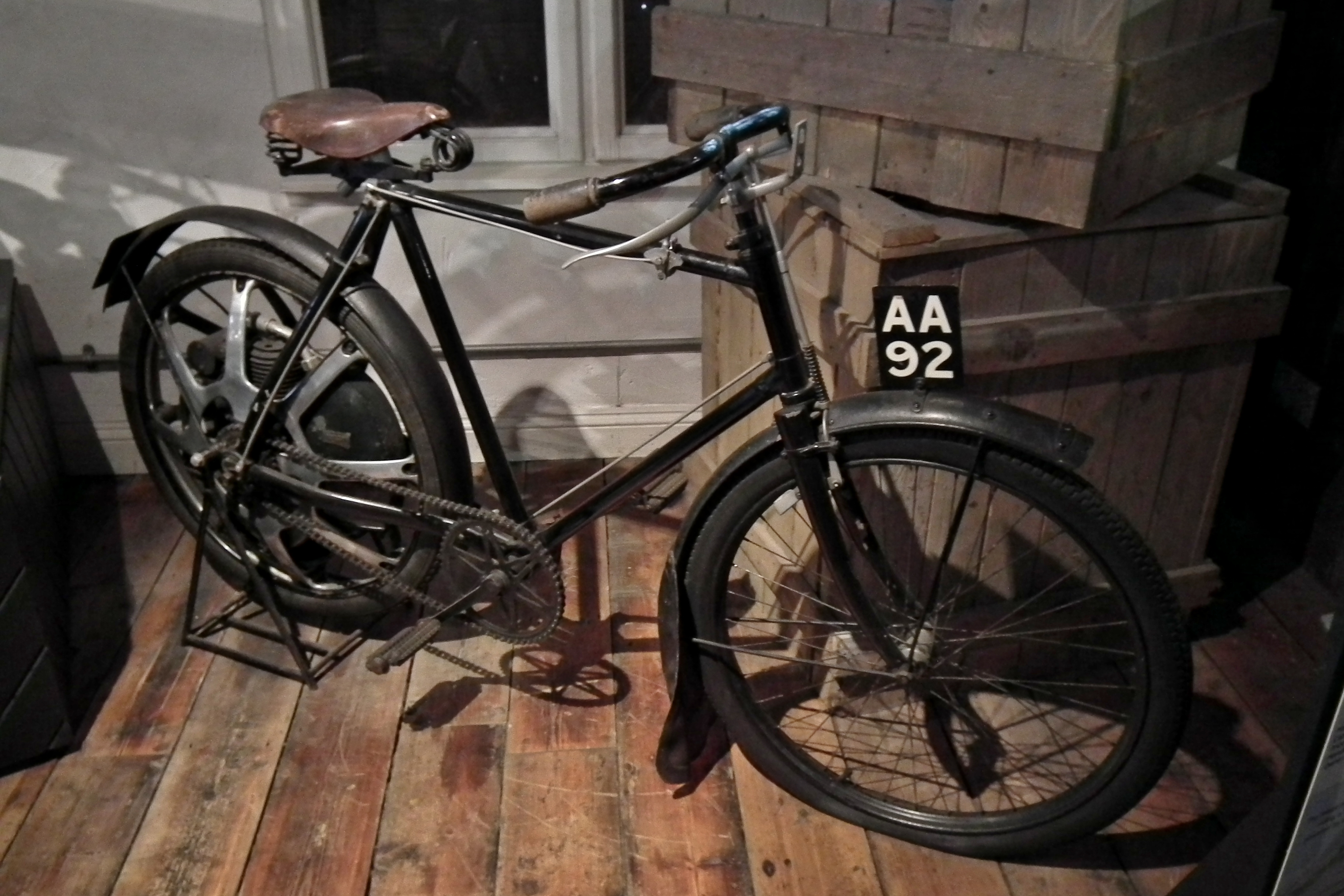
Perks and Birch Autowheel

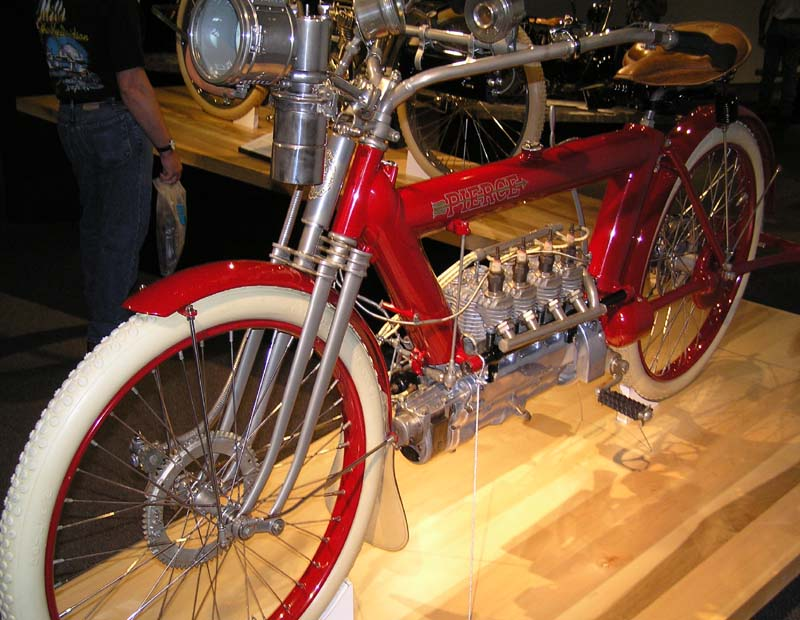
Pierce Four

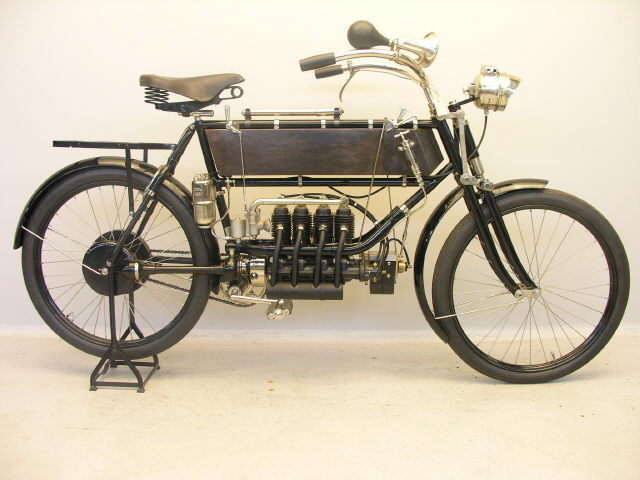
1905 FN Four

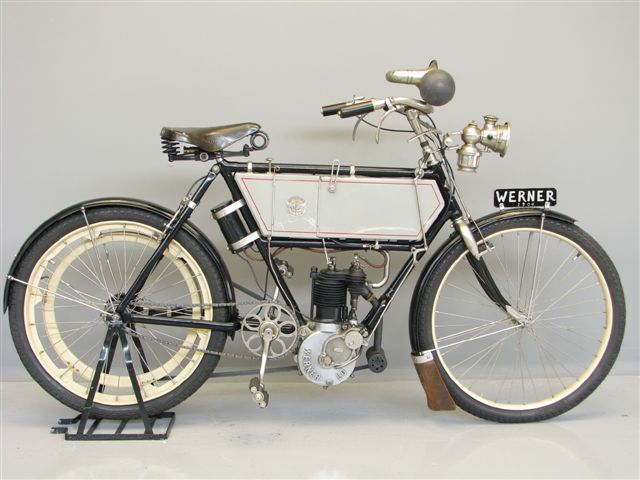
Werner 1904 New Werner with 230 cc engine

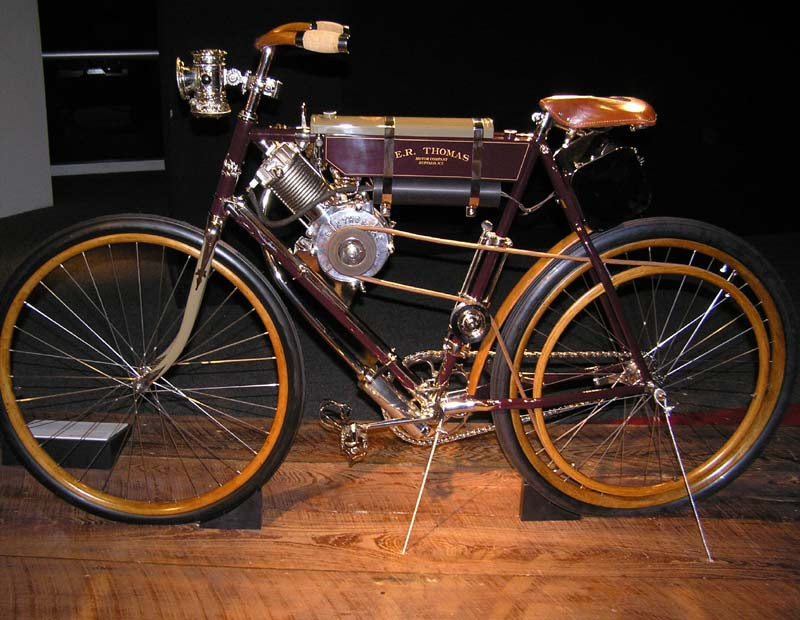
Thomas Auto-Bi

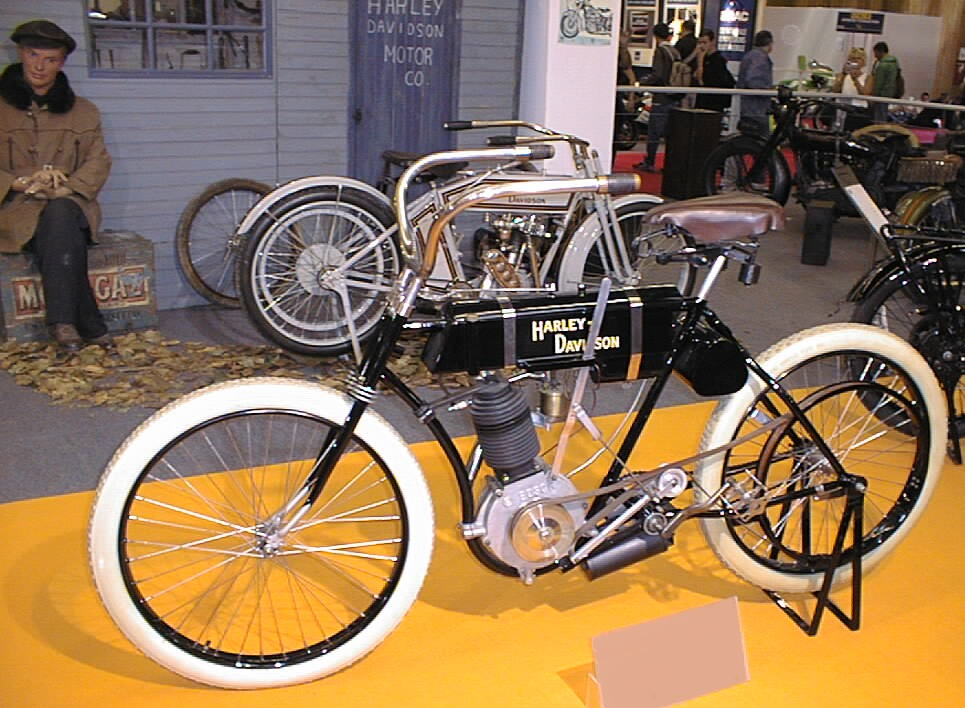
Harley-Davidson prototype

== Tricycle ==
- De Dion-Bouton tricycle (produced 1897 to 1904)
- Rochet trike with De Dion engines (1900–1910)
- Orient tricycle

== See also ==
- Brass Era car
- Cyclecars
- Ford Model T
- List of motorcycle manufacturers
- List of motorcycles by type of engine
- List of motorcycles of the 1890s
- List of motorcycles of the 1910s
- List of motorcycles of the 1920s
- List of motorcycles of the 1930s
- List of motorcycles of the 1940s
- List of motorized trikes
- Quadricycle
- Safety bicycle
- Timeline of motorized bicycle history
