= FN (motorcycle) =

Belgian motorcycle manufacturer

FN (Fabrique Nationale de Herstal) is a Belgian company established in 1889 to make arms and ammunition, and from 1901 to 1967 was also a motorcycle manufacturer. FN manufactured one of the world's first four-cylinder motorcycles, was famous for the use of shaft drive in all models from 1903 to 1923, achieved success in sprint and long-distance motorcycle racing, and after 1945, also in motocross.

== Early FN motorcycle history ==
In 1899, FN made shaft- and chain-driven bicycles, and in 1900 experimented with a clip-on engine.

=== Singles ===
In December 1901, the first 133 cc single-cylinder motorcycle was built, followed in 1903 by a shaft-driven 188 cc single-cylinder motorcycle. In 1904 a 300 cc single-cylinder motorcycle was produced. The 1907 single-cylinder 244 cc FN motorcycle was the first bike with a multiple-ratio belt drive system, using a patented variable-size engine pulley. In 1909 the two-speed singles had camshafts to open the inlets, instead of the earlier "automatic" valves. Starting from 1912 the singles had a hand lever clutch and foot pedal rear brake.

=== The FN Four ===
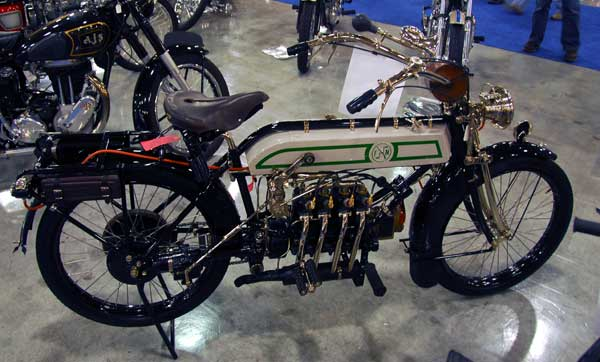
1913 FN Four

In 1905, the first 362 cc shaft-drive in-line FN inlet-over-exhaust four-cylinder motorcycle appeared, designed by Paul Kelecom. This was the world's first series-manufactured four-cylinder motorcycle. By 1907 the Four engine had grown to 412 cc. For 1908, the US Export model began manufacture. The Four had a 493 cc engine, and in 1910 that became 498 cc. This bike weighed 75 kg (165 lb) dry, and could do 40 mph (64 km/h). The 1913 Fours had a two-speed gearbox and clutch, at the rear of the shaft drive, and bicycle pedals were permanently replaced with footrests from then on. For 1914 the FN "Type 700" 748 cc Four was released, with the gearbox at the rear of the engine.

== After WWI ==
By the end of World War I, after having to manufacture motorcycles for their occupiers, FN had few parts left, and some suppliers had gone. From 1921 the letter "T" was added to model names. The Type 700T Four had a three-speed gearbox. In 1922 the Type 285TT single had an improved cylinder head. Also the first racer, the Type VII was built.

From 1924, all models had the less expensive chain drive. Most of these were sv and ohv 348 cc and 498 cc singles. The FN M70 "Sahara" 348cc side valve was the most produced FN motorcycle of the interwar period. It was famous for as the name says crossing the Sahara in the 1920s. The FN M90 was as 498cc side valve which was produced in the 1930s. There were also 596 cc ohv machines. The FN M86 is very nice example of a 498cc ohv built in the 1930s. From 1924 FN single-cylinder engines changed from semi unit construction (as seen in the last semi-unit single, the 1922 FN 285TT, in its last year of sale in 1924,) to unit construction engines (as seen in the new-for-1924 M.60). A new chain driven M.50 Four was released with a new Amac carburettor and front brakes. In 1931 a Villiers 198 cc two-stroke FN model appeared. In 1938, the M.12 992 cc air-cooled sv flat twin was built for military use, and the all alloy M.11 was released in 350 cc ohv, 500 cc sv and 600 cc sv models. Then World War II intervened. An M.12 Tri-car was developed and produced for military use.

== After WWII ==
After the War FN built unit construction sv and ohv 249 cc, 344 cc, 444 cc, and 498 cc models, and two-stroke models from 49 cc singles, to 248 cc twins. The two-stroke models used German JLO engines. The semi-unit engined Tri-car was released for civilian commercial use as the Tri-car T-8, with a five-speed gearbox. In 1947 the M.XIII was available in 250 cc ohv, 350 cc ohv, 350 cc sv, 450 cc ohv, and 450 cc sv configurations. The first model used an unusual patented Swiss coil sprung girder front fork and a new rubber rear suspension. In 1948, the Swiss forks were replaced with an adaptation of the rubber rear suspension, which was itself replaced with an improved version. In 1951 the option of telescopic forks was introduced. In 1954 a swing arm frame was introduced. By 1958, the M.XIII toolbox was part of the fuel tank.

There was some success in motocross, with riders like Mingels, Leloup, and R Beaten, but FN withdrew from competition at the end of the 1950s.

Famous designers who worked for FN include Paul Kelecom, Van Hout, Dougal Marchant, and George-William Pratchett.

Famous pre-war racers associated with FN include Kicken, Flintermann, Lovinfosse, Lempereur, Sbaiz, De Grady, René Milhoux, Charlier, Pol Demeuter, Noir, Van Gent, Renier, S "Ginger" Wood, Wal Handley, Ted Mellors, and Abarth.

=== Mopeds ===
In 1955, FN introduced a line of outsourced mopeds, built by Royal Nord. For the Type-S, 100 cc and 200 cc two-stroke engines were sourced from Sarolea. In 1959 in-house FN mopeds appeared, the Utilitaire, Luxe, Fabrina, Princess, and a sport model, the "Rocket".

=== End of FN motorcycle production ===
Some time between 1962 and 1966 the M.XIII ceased production. FN last exhibited at a motorcycle show in 1965. Production ceased in 1966. In May 1967 the last FN moped left the factory.

== FN racing and competitions ==
=== 1908 Isle of Man TT ===
In 1908, R O Clark of England took third place in the Multi-cylinder class. He was well known for his early involvement in motorcycling events and distance records on FN motorcycles. He entered the 1909 TT but did not finish.

=== 1914 Isle of Man TT ===
Two FN fours were entered, by S B White and Rex Mundy, and they finished in 33rd and 36th place, respectively, from 103 starters, an hour slower than the winner, and an hour faster than the last rider to come in. The bikes were of 500 cc, and not the production 748 cc, suggesting that they were specially constructed.

=== 1931 Isle of Man TT ===
In 1931, Wal Handley was entered on an FN, instead of the usual Rudge, but his FN broke down in practice, and he qualified on a Rudge. FN repaired the bike, and held Handley to his contract. The gearbox locked on his first lap at the Quarterbridge due to an incorrectly assembled gearbox sleeve that had shaken loose on the descent of Bray Hill. Despite the failure on the day, there was no doubt the FN was a fine machine. The year before, with Handley or Dougal Marchant aboard, similar machines of 350 cc and 500 cc had set speed records at Arpajon and Montlhery, recording speeds up to 192.7 km/h (500 cc flying mile). At the end of 1930, FN held 33 World Records.

=== 1937 Supercharged ohc twin ===
Dougal Marchant joined the FN firm in 1930, and he created some very rapid 348 cc and 498 cc ohc racing singles. Van Hout developed these in the following years, and then, in 1937, designed a supercharged 498 cc vertical twin ohc racer, ridden in 1938 by "Ginger" Wood.

=== Lambert Schepers and FN (1952–1988) ===
Lambert Schepers started his FN career in the repair and restoration section, where he dealt with repairing and restoring FN models from 1902 to 1930. During this period he mastered all technical facets of FN motors.

In 1953, he went to Germany to do military service, and because of his knowledge and training, he was assigned to military despatch duty. He carried the mail from barracks to barracks on a Type 13 450 cc sv FN army motorcycle.

In 1955, he returned to FN, where he was employed in the competition department. The department competed in three different branches of the motor sport, observed trials, motocross, and the 24 hours. Lambert mainly competed in the trials rides, but also the 24 hours endurance events.

He was also engaged in the testing of new models and engines, subjecting them to high mileages and varying conditions, on the Francochamps circuit, and in the neighbouring Ardennes, along with his colleagues Samovic, George René, Walravens and Marcel Dubois, and their fitters Michel Collard and Stefan. He had another close colleague, Jean Somja who competed in motocross. They would do 300 km daily on the 50 cc bikes, and 500 km on the larger bikes, regardless of weather conditions.

Lambert rode in Belgian observed trials competitions and he won for FN from 1955 to 1960 almost all national 50 cc competitions that there were to be won in Belgium. He won the 24-hour Oudenaarde, which reduced many of the lone riders to total exhaustion.

In 1960, Lambert went international, riding in France and Austria. In Austria he participated in the Six Days on an FN 75 cc machine, along with 356 other entrants. After three days, half were gone. He damaged his bike on the fifth day, losing his oil through a blown gasket, and forced to retire. Belgian Television has much archival footage of the 24 hours Austrian event, some of it critical of the levels of exhaustion inflicted on riders, and characterising 24 hours events as "bad sport".

The high point for Lambert Schepers came in 1960 when he became Champion of Belgium in the trials competition, and was presented with a gold medal, but after the Belgian Championships FN closed the racing department. Lambert had a new position with FN in 1961, testing combat plane motors, such as the Spitfire, Avon, Lorenda, Starfire, Mirage, and finally, the F16.

He and his sons continued involvement in motocross, and his son Guido rode in the Juniors against George Jobe, where they were each other's greatest competitor. Guido's education took precedence over competition, while George Jobe went on to a 1983 250 cc world motocross championship title. In 1988 Lambert retired on a well earned pension.

=== European Motocross 500 GP (1952–1957) ===
In 1953, there were now eight rounds since the Netherlands and Switzerland joined the circuit. Auguste Mingels, Belgium (Matchless/FN) became 1953 European 500 Motocross Champion. His fellow countryman René Baeten, (Saroléa) took second and Victor Leloup, Belgium (FN) third. The Belgian trio were under pressure from the British riders, who took places four to seven in the final standings.

The 1954 event had similar results regarding the top riders. There were still the same eight rounds. Auguste Mingels, Belgium (FN) became 1954 European 500 Motocross Champion, with René Baeten, Belgium (Saroléa) second. Jeff Smith, Great Britain (BSA Gold Star) and Victor Leloup, Belgium (FN) both ended up on the same points, 20p. The young Jeff Smith, already a successful trials rider, was about to become a great motocross rider.

=== World Championship Motocross 500 GP (1957–1959) ===
In 1957, the series got World championship status, with nine races held at: Sweden (Saxtorp), Italy (Imola), Belgium (Namur), Luxemburg (Ettelbruck), the Netherlands (Lichtenwoorde), France (Cassel), Great Britain (Brands Hatch), Denmark (Randers) and Switzerland (Wohlen). This change of status meant that foreign riders who had been racing under English license now could compete for their own country. Bill Nilsson, Sweden rode an AJS and managed to win the title in front of René Baeten, Belgium (FN) and Sten Lundin, Sweden (Monark) as second and third.

For 1958 there were 10 races with Austria (Sittendorf) added to the series. René Baeten, Belgium (FN) took first place, becoming 1958 World Motocross Champion, with Bill Nilsson, Sweden (Crescent) second. Sten Lundin, Sweden (Monark) took third again.

=== Motocross Des Nations 500 cc (1950–1959) ===
In 1950, 27 August in Sweden (Värnamo-Skillingaryd) Belgium was third with: Marcel Cox (Saroléa), A Meert (Saroléa) and Victor Leloup (FN). Great Britain won, with Sweden second.

In 1951, 5 August in Belgium (Namur), Belgium won, their team Nic Jansen (Saroléa), Victor Leloup (FN) and Marcel Meunier (Saroléa). Great Britain was second and France third. One of France's riders, Gilbert Brassine, rode an FN.

In 1952, 17 August at Brands Hatch, Great Britain won. Belgium got second. Auguste Mingels (Matchless), Victor Leloup (FN) and A Van Heuverzwijn (Saroléa) were the riders. Sweden was third.

On 23 August 1953, in Sweden (Värnamo-Skillingaryd), another British victory. Belgium second with the team: Victor Leloup (FN), Auguste Mingels (FN) and René Baeten (Saroléa). Sweden was third again.

In 1954, 29 August in the Netherlands (Norg) Belgium came third, with Victor Leloup (FN), A Van Heuverzwijn (Saroléa) and Nic Jansen (Saroléa). Great Britain won, with Sweden second.

On 28 August 1955, in Denmark (Randers) Sweden won. Belgium came in second with René Baeten (Matchless), Victor Leloup (FN) and Jean Somja (FN). Third went to the Netherlands with: Hendrik Rietman (FN), Frans Baudoin (Matchless), Jan Clijnk (BSA).

The 1956,26 August competition in Belgium (Namur)was won by Great Britain, with Sweden second, and Belgium third, with René Baeten (FN), Jean Rombauts (BSA) and Nic Jansen (Matchless).

In 1957, 1 September in Great Britain (Brands Hatch) Britain won again, Belgium at second place with René Baeten (FN), Nic Jansen (Matchless), Hubert Scaillet (FN), followed by Sweden.

The 1958, 8 September event in Sweden (Knutstorp), saw Sweden win, with Great Britain second, and France third.

For 1959, 30 August in Belgium (Namur), Great Britain won, Sweden was second, and Belgium was third with Nic Jansen (Machless), Hubert Scaillet (Matchless), Lucien Donnay (FN).

Toward the end of the 1960 season René Baeten was killed during competition. Sweden won.

== See also ==
- FN (automobile)
- FN Herstal
