= Compression release =

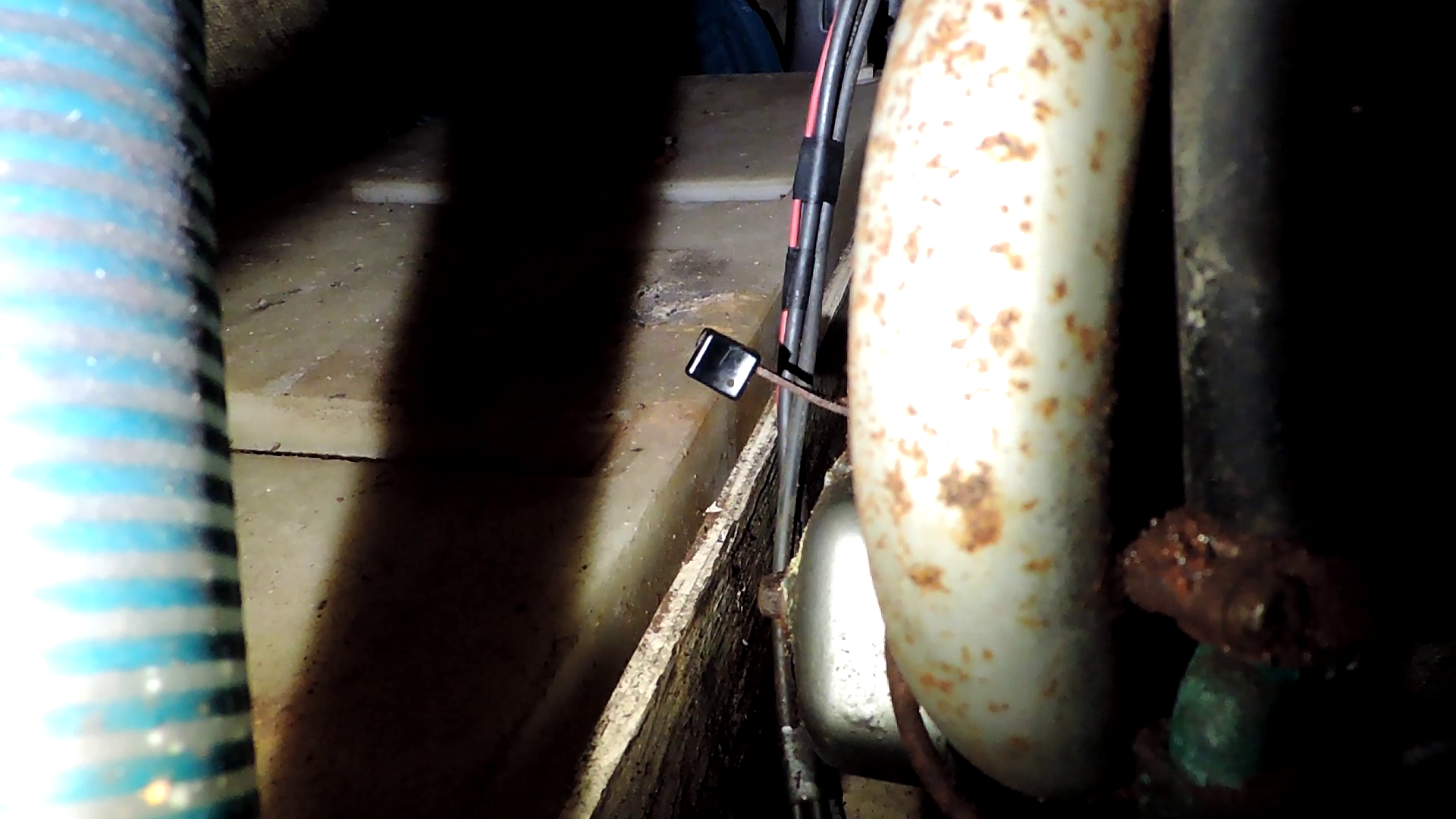
The decompression valve (black lever) on a Yanmar YSB8 marine diesel engine.

A compression release is a mechanism to ease the starting of an internal combustion engine by allowing it to rotate to starting speed without having to work against the compression of the pistons. It does this via either a release valve that is incorporated within the cylinder head that vents the cylinder pressure to the outside atmosphere until the engine has sufficient momentum to overcome it, or by venting straight through one of the main valves.

US patent US5375570 A of 1994 describes an automated compression release valve actuated by engine oil pressure.

== Motorcycles ==
Early large displacement motorcycles with kick starters provided riders with a manual compression release while later models linked them to the kick start lever with a cable for automatic operation. The 2012 Ducati 1199, equipped with an electric starter, uses a compression release that is automatically activated at low engine speed by a centrifugal flyweight on each exhaust cam. This reduces the work needed to spin the high 12.5:1 compression ratio engine, allowing for a smaller battery and starter motor, amounting to a total weight saving of 3.3 kilograms (7.3 lb).

From the mid-1960s to the late-1970s, engine compression releases were also used to supplement rear wheel braking on many two-stroke motorcycles, primarily those used off-road or for various types of dirt-track racing, such as motocross and flat-tracking. Since two-stroke engines normally lack the compression braking effect of four-stroke engines when the throttle is shut off, the addition of a compression release brake on two-strokes essentially mimicked the four-stroke compression braking effect. Using throttle-off engine compression for at least some braking on both two-stroke and four-stroke motorcycles was especially important during that era, since most motorcycles used drum brakes, which fade more quickly than modern disc brakes.

== Diesel engines ==
Small diesel engines may be fitted with compression release valves if they are to be started by hand cranking.

== Small engines ==
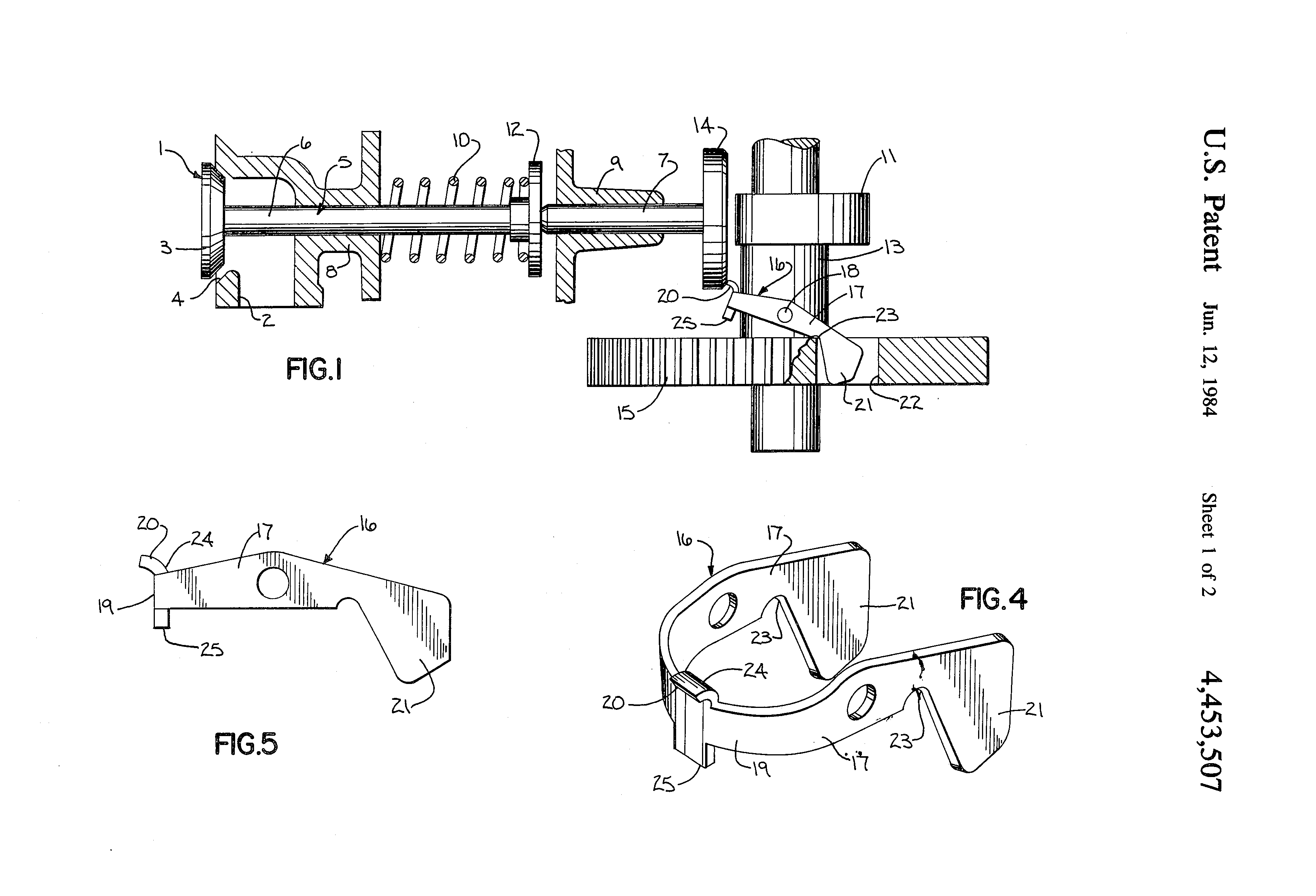
Diagram of a centrifugally actuated compression release mechanism

Most small gasoline engines used in power equipment use an automatic compression release system of some kind, designed to reduce load on the starter motor or user manually starting the engine. The most common kind of small engine compression release uses a camshaft mounted mechanical lever that pushes the exhaust valve tappet slightly, venting engine compression through the exhaust valve. Once the engine spins to starting speed, centrifugal force causes the lever to move out of the way, and the exhaust valve is allowed to seat fully. Older compression release systems used a small bump on the cam that would bump the valve very slightly at low speeds. Once the engine gained speed, the pressure would push the exhaust valve against its seat. These systems were phased out as mechanical compression releases became common.

== See also ==
- Engine braking
