= List of motorcycles of the 1890s =

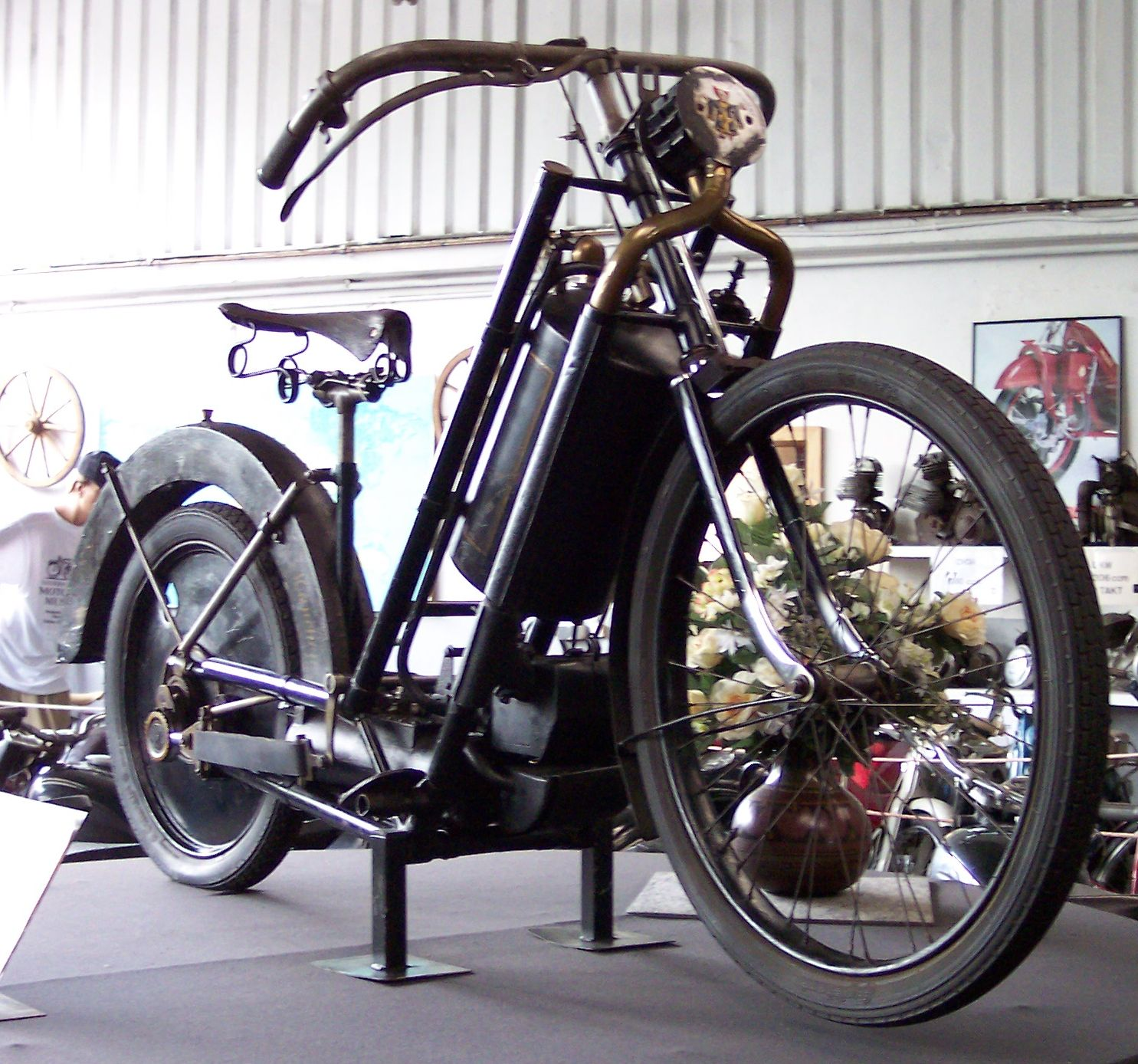
1894 Hildebrand & Wolfmüller

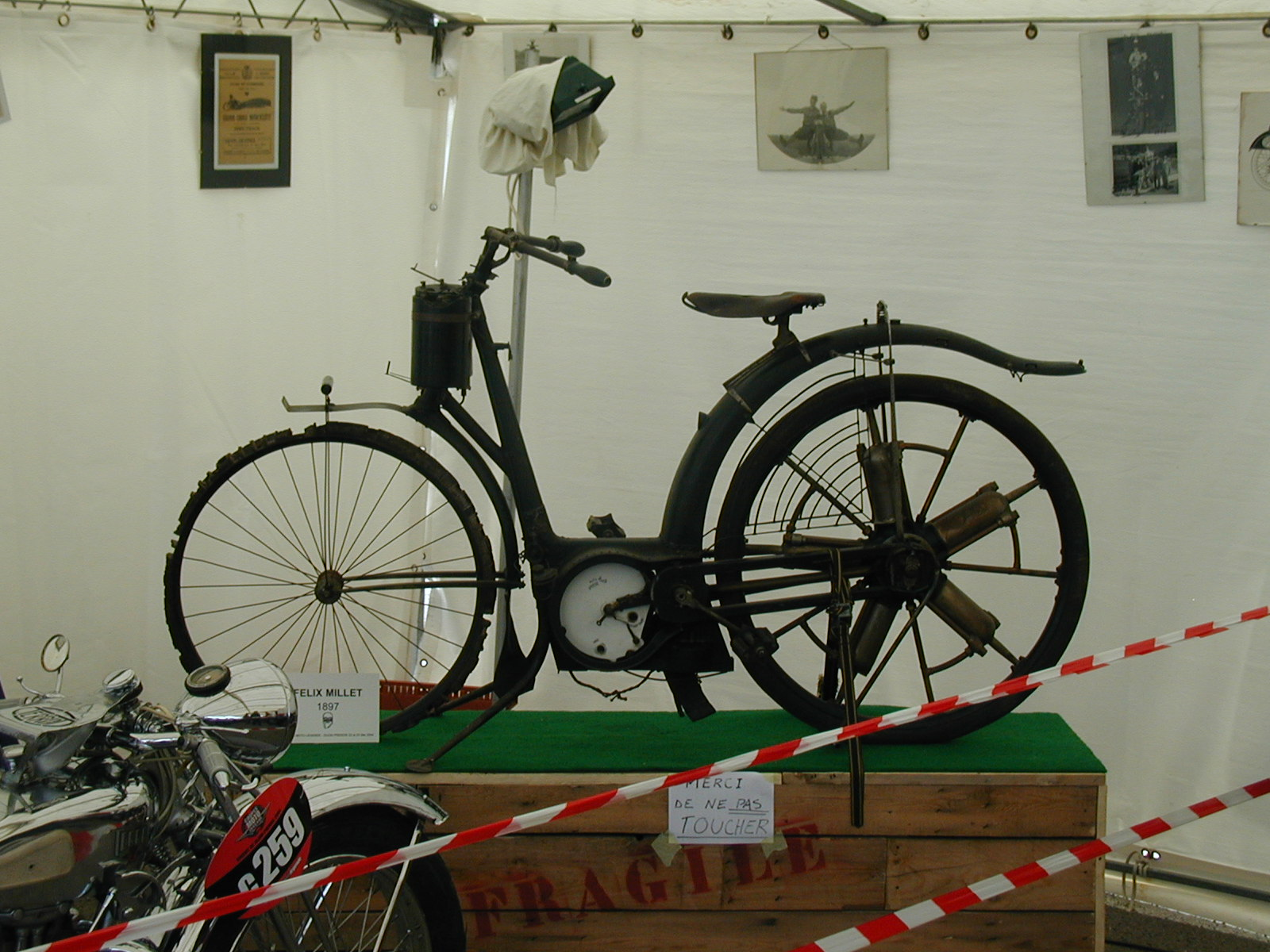
1897 Millet

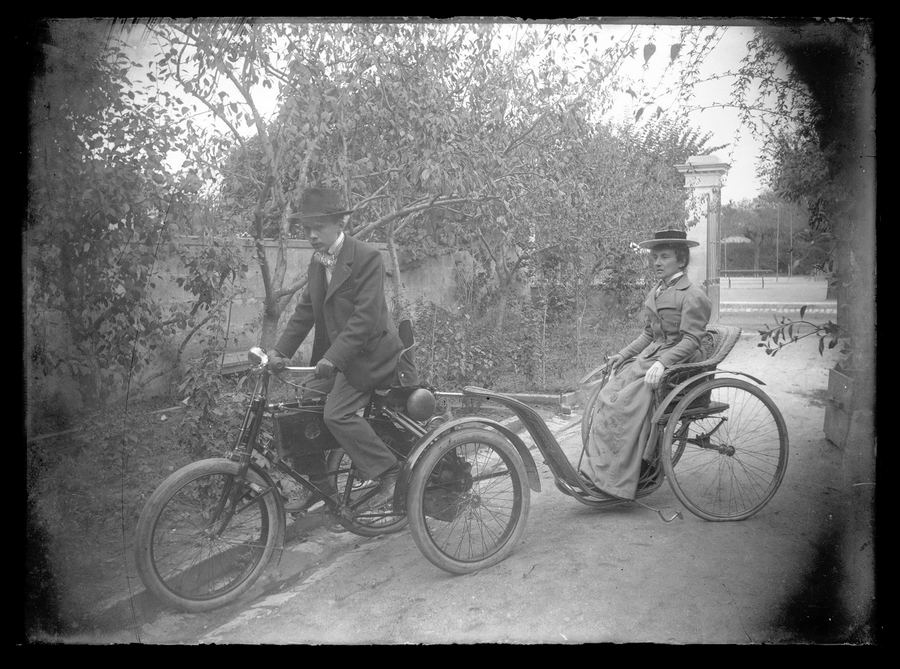
De Dion trike with a seat trailer

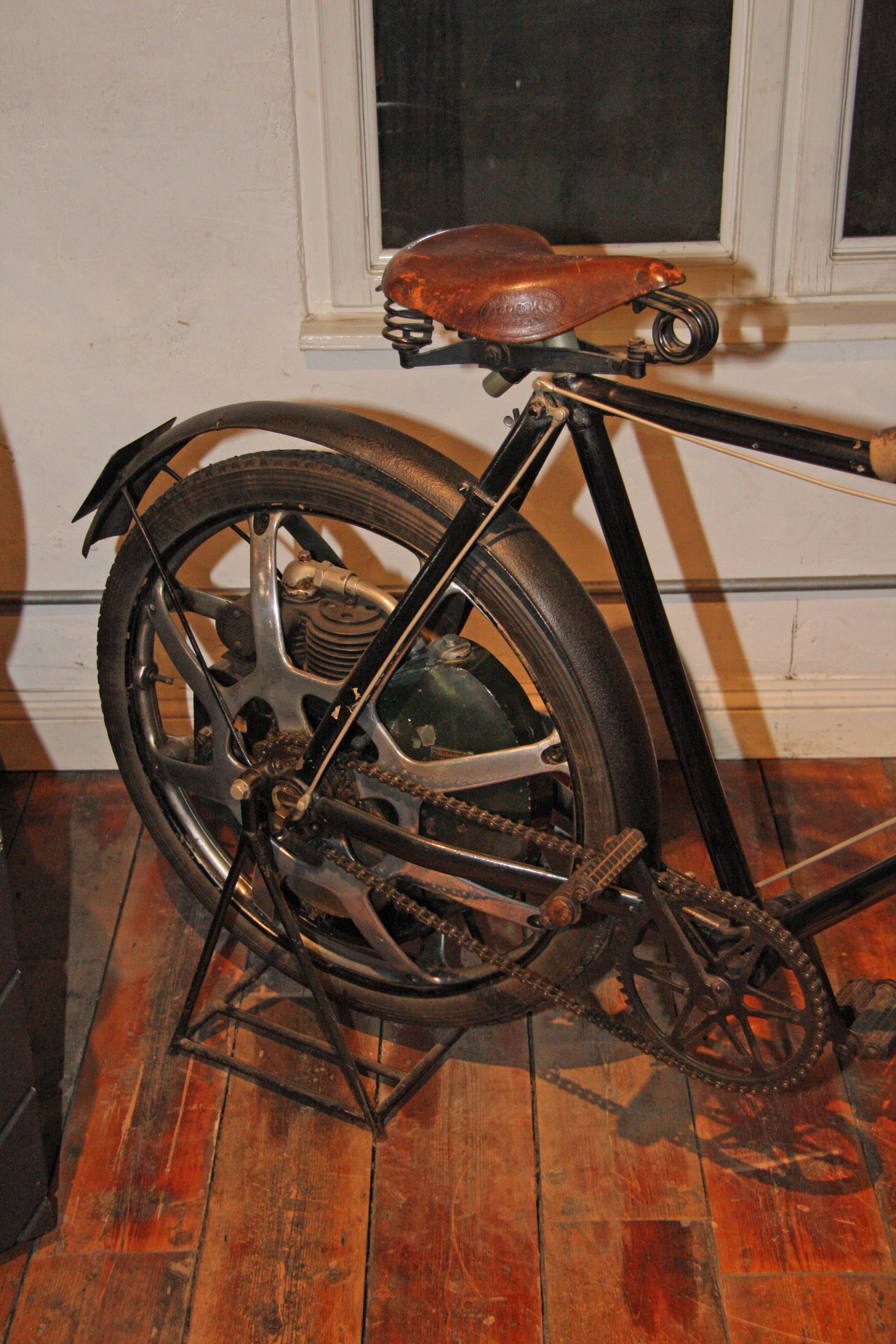
Perks & Birch Autowheel

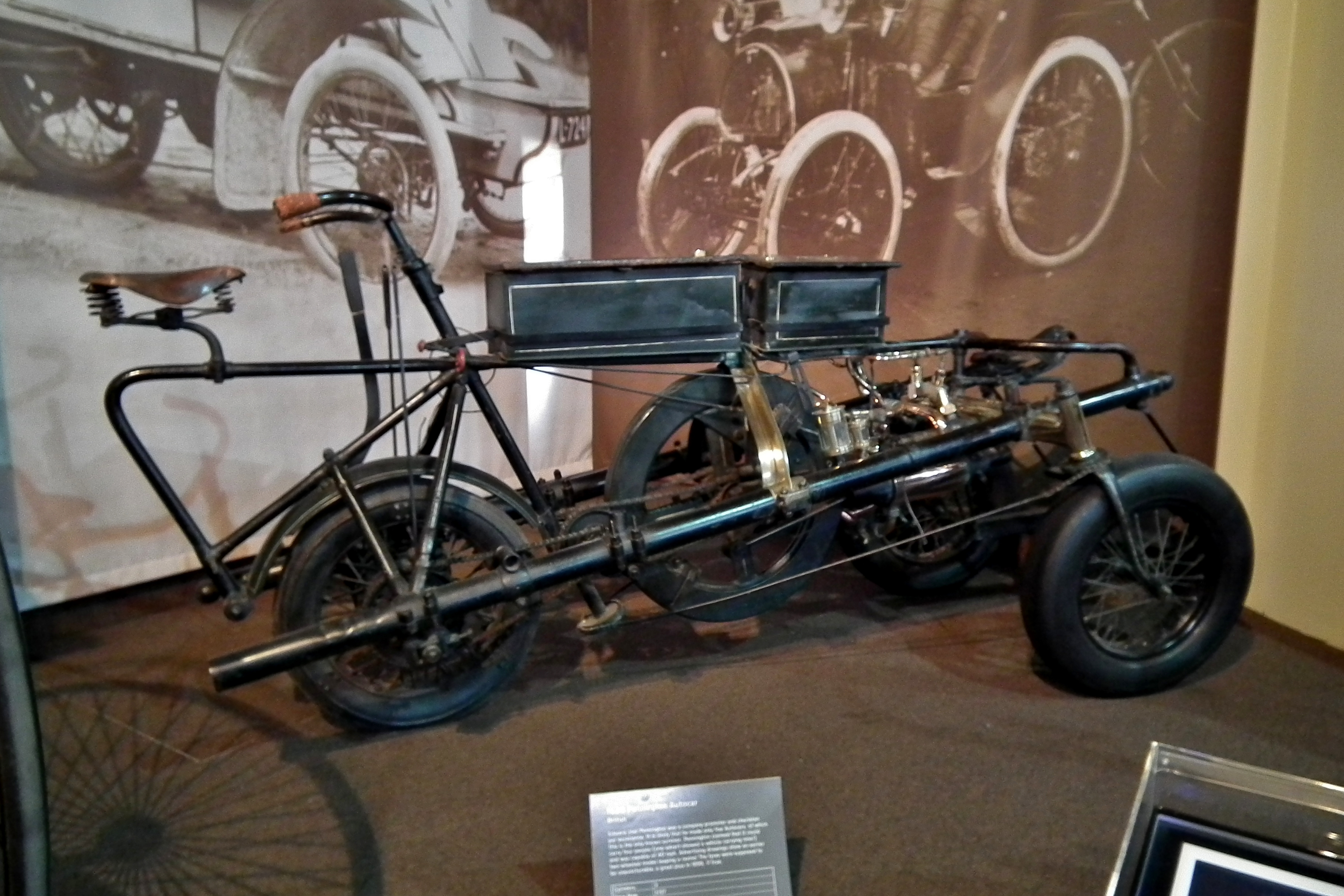
1896 Pennington Autocar

List of motorcycles of the 1890s aka motorrad (DE) sometimes motor cycle or moto cycle

== Motorcycle ==
- Hildebrand & Wolfmüller
- Geneva steam bicycle
- Marks motorcycle (1896–1901)
- Millet motorcycle
- Pennington motor bicycle
- Roper 1896 steamer bike (see also Roper steam velocipedes)
- Werner Motors 1897 model(motor over front wheel)
- Excelsior Motor Company (UK) 1896 Crystal Palace motorcycle with Minerva
- Perks & Birch Motor-wheel (1899–1904)

== Tricycle ==
- Ariel tricycle (1898)
- Benz Patent-Motorwagen (1885–1893)
- Léon Bollée Voiturette
- De Dion-Bouton tricycle (produced 1897 to 1904)
- Long steam tricycle
- Indian Tri-Car (1907)
- Motrice Pia
- Orient tricycle
- Pennington Autocar (1896)
- Clark gasoline tricycle (1897)

== See also ==
- History of steam road vehicles
- History of the motorcycle
- List of motorcycles by type of engine
- List of motorcycles of 1900 to 1909
- List of motorcycles of the 1910s
- List of motorcycles of the 1920s
- List of motorcycles of the 1930s
- List of motorized trikes
- Roper steam velocipede
- Safety bicycle
- Scooter (motorcycle)
- Steam tricycle
- Timeline of motorized bicycle history
- Steam car
