= Long steam tricycle =

19th-century motorcycle

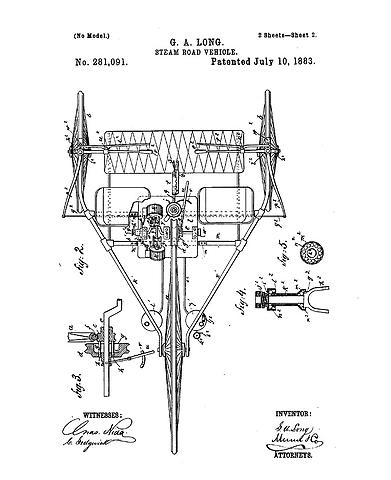
- Manufacturer: George Alvin Long
- Production: c. 1880
- Class: Steam tricycle
- Engine: Gasoline-fired steam, 2-cylinder, 90-degree, V-twin engine
- Bore / stroke: Unk.×1 5/8"
- Transmission: Two speed, rear-wheel drive via quasi friction drive
- Frame type: Steel tubular
- Suspension: Solid; full-elliptic springs suspending independent, height adjustable seats
- Brakes: 2×Spoon brake (front)
- Tires: Front: 2×36 in (910 mm); Rear: 60 in (1,500 mm); Solid tires on spoked wheels
- Weight: 350 lb (160 kg) (wet)

The Long steam tricycle appears to be one of the earliest preserved examples of a steam tricycle, built by George Alvin Long around 1880 and patented in 1883. One example was built, which after some years of use was dismantled and the parts dispersed. In 1946, one John H. Bacon, with assistance from the 96-year-old Long, reassembled the machine, which is now on display at the Smithsonian Institution. The example at the Smithsonian has been noted as the "oldest completely operable self-propelled road vehicle in the museum".

In 2004–2010, the item was displayed at Blackhawk Museum in northern California.

== Specifications ==
Specifications in the infobox to the right are from the Smithsonian Institution America on the Move collection.

Steering the two front wheels was accomplished via two independent tillers which would have made simultaneous steering and control of the brake levers difficult for a single individual.

== See also ==
- List of motorized trikes
- List of motorcycles of the 1890s
- History of steam road vehicles
- Steam engine
