= Geneva steam bicycle =

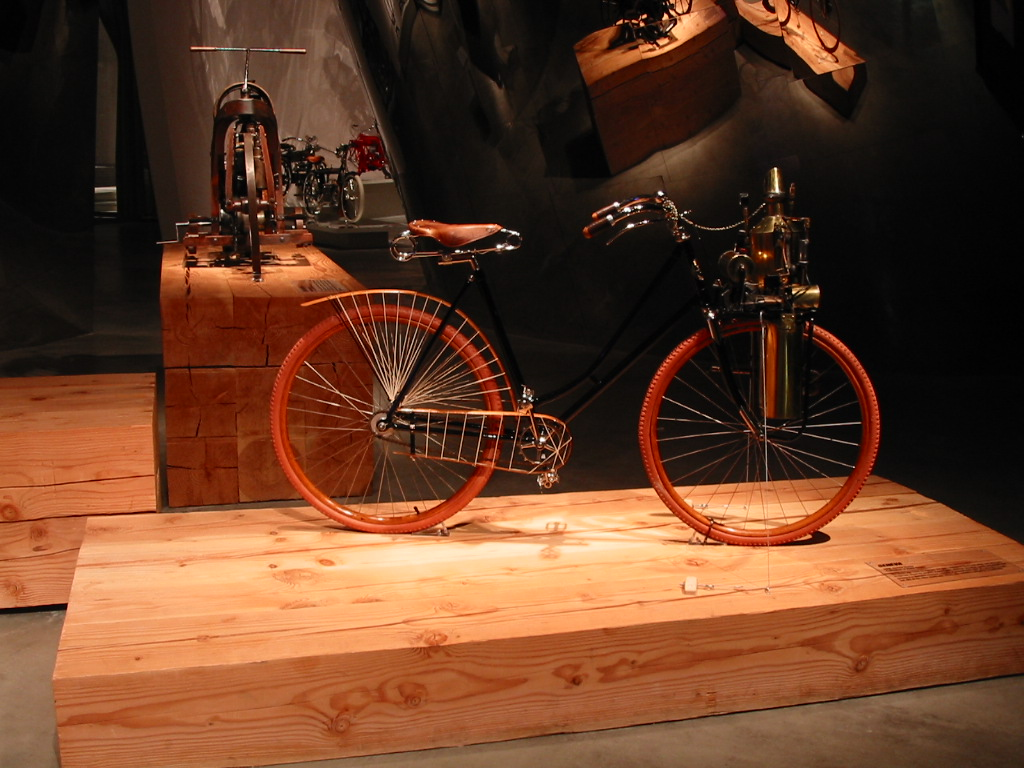
- Geneva steam bicycle at Guggenheim The Art of the Motorcycle exhibit, Las Vegas
- Manufacturer: Geneva Bicycle and Steam Carriage Co. (Geneva, Ohio)
- Engine: Steam engine
- Bore / stroke: 1.5 × 1.5 in.
- Top speed: 12 mph (19 km/h)
- Power: 0.5 horsepower (0.37 kW)
- Frame type: 1886 Star bicycle

The Geneva steam bicycle was a steam powered motorcycle made by the Geneva Cycle Company, Geneva, Ohio, in the United States in the late 19th century, in 1896. An example was displayed at The Art of the Motorcycle exhibit created by the Guggenheim Museum. The naptha-fired steam engine is based on a design by Lucius Copeland. The Geneva Cycle Company became part of the American Cycle Company about the turn of the century, and later the Geneva brand was acquired by the Pope and Westfield Manufacturing Companies.

== See also ==
- List of motorcycles by type of engine
- List of motorcycles of the 1890s
