= Enrico Bernardi =

Italian engineer (1841–1919)

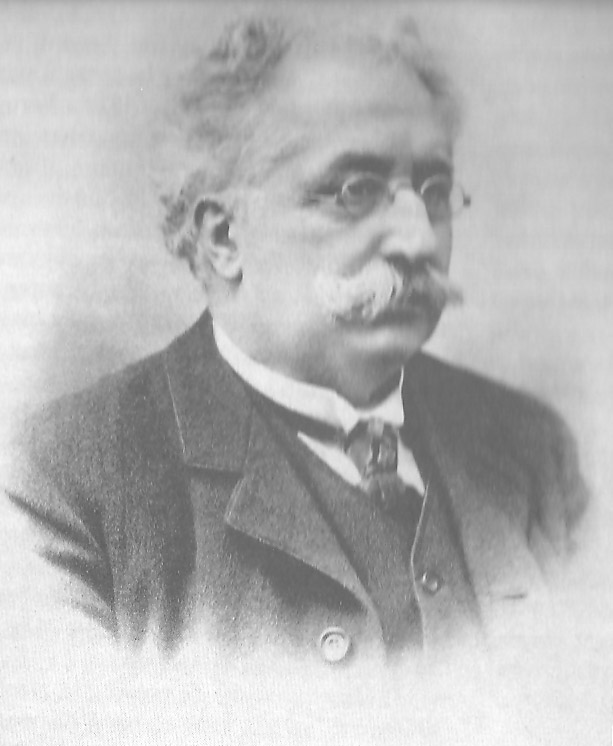
Enrico Bernardi

Enrico Zeno Bernardi (20 May 1841 in Verona – 21 February 1919 in Turin) was an Italian engineer and one of the Italian automobile pioneers. As a child growing up in Verona, Bernardi spent much of his free time in blacksmiths' workshops learning the skills to put his inventive abilities into practice. In 1856, he entered a mechanical model of a steam engine and locomotive in the Verona Agricultural Exhibition, where he earned an honorable mention for his work.

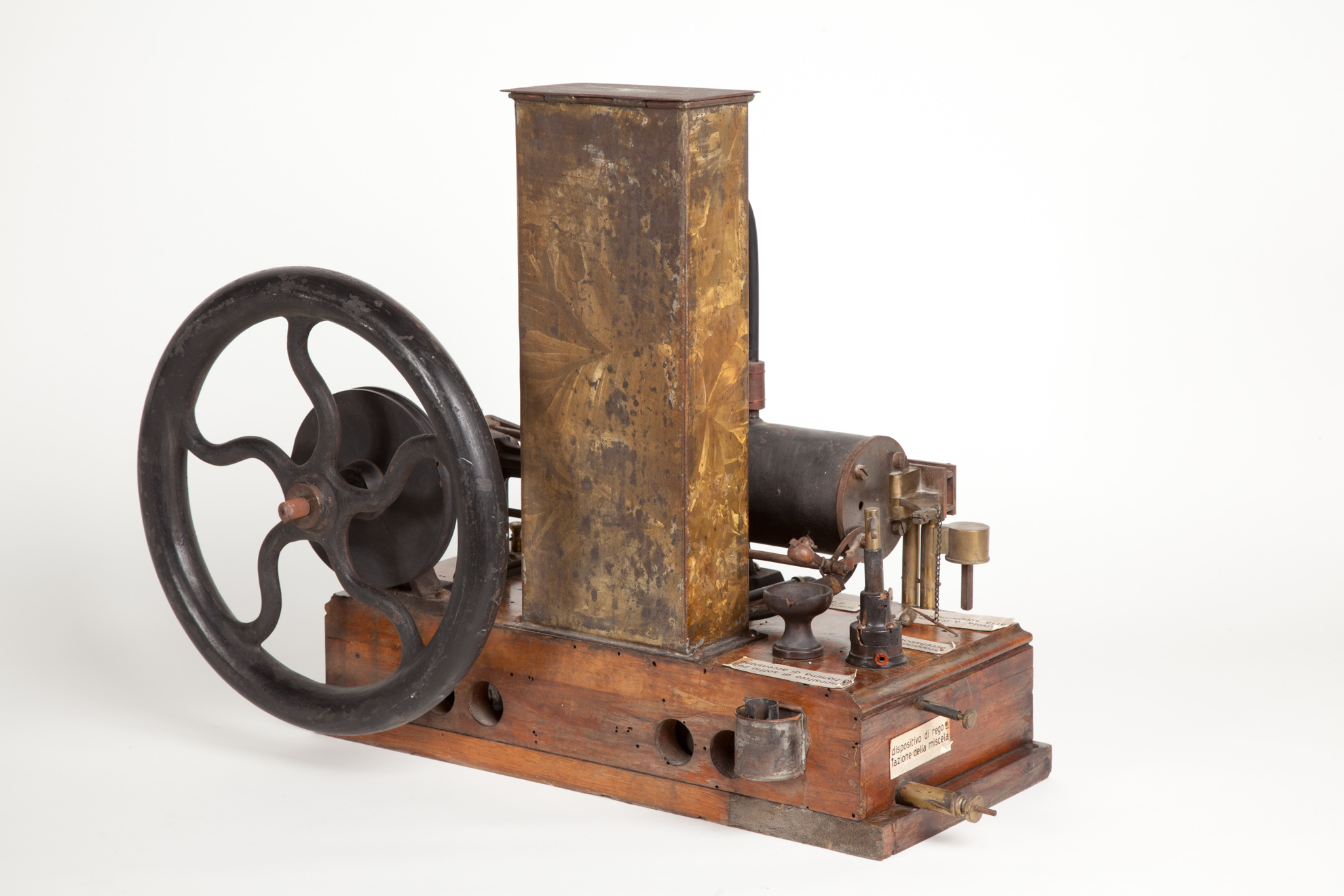
Prototype of combustion engine by Enrico Bernardi, exhibited at the Museo nazionale della scienza e della tecnologia Leonardo da Vinci, Milan.

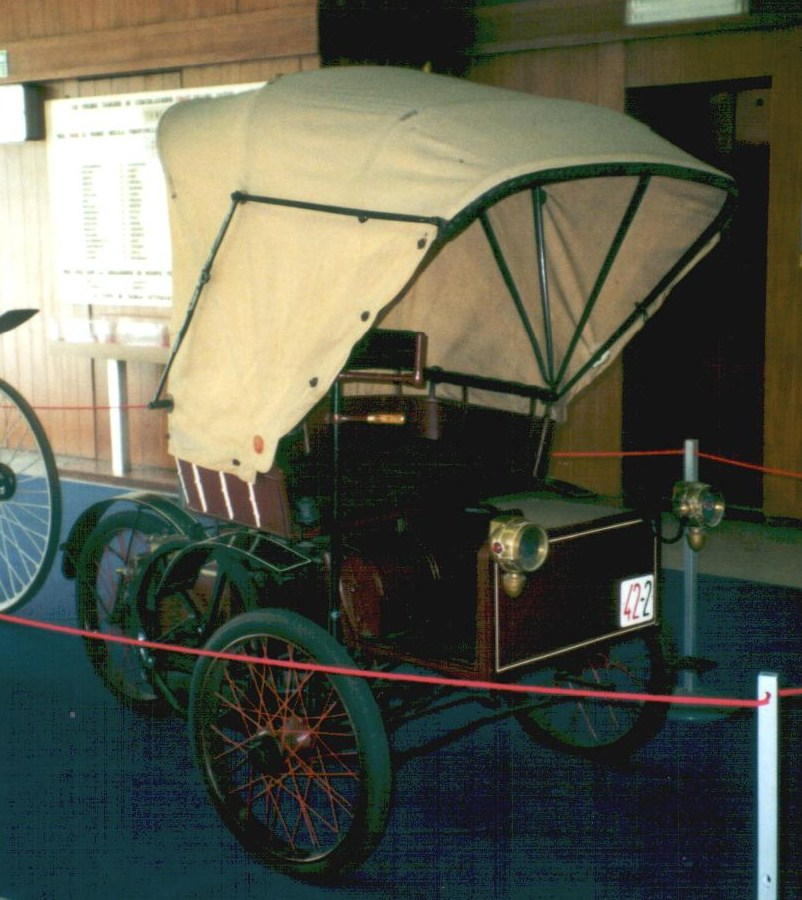
A Bernardi tricycle from 1896

Bernardi completed his secondary education in Verona and enrolled in the University of Padua in October 1859. He received a doctorate in mathematics from the University of Padua in June 1863 and remained at the University as an assistant to the chairs of the departments of Geodesy, Hydrometry, Rational Mechanics, and Experimental Physics. In 1867, Bernardi became the chair of Physics and Mechanics at the Royal Institute of Vocational Industry in Vicenza. He became dean of the Royal Institute and remained in that position until 1878, when he became a Professor of Hydraulic and Agricultural Machinery at the University of Padua and directed the Institute of Machinery there from 1879 until 1915.

On 5 August 1882 he prototyped the Motrice Pia, his petrol combustion engine (one cylinder, 121.6 cm^{3} displacement), almost at the same time as German Karl Benz. The engine was used to operate his daughter Pia's sewing machine and was fitted to his son's tricycle in 1884. A company called Miari & Giusti in Padova started production of Bernardi's engines and cars in 1894. Soon the company was taken over by Società Italiana Bernardi. It stopped production in 1901.

After withdrawing from academic life he moved in 1917 to Turin, where he died two years later. Bernardi was later honoured in many ways: a museum of vintage cars (Museo delle Macchine "Enrico Bernardi") was opened in Padua and an asteroid, 25216 Enricobernardi, was named for him.
