= Motrice Pia =

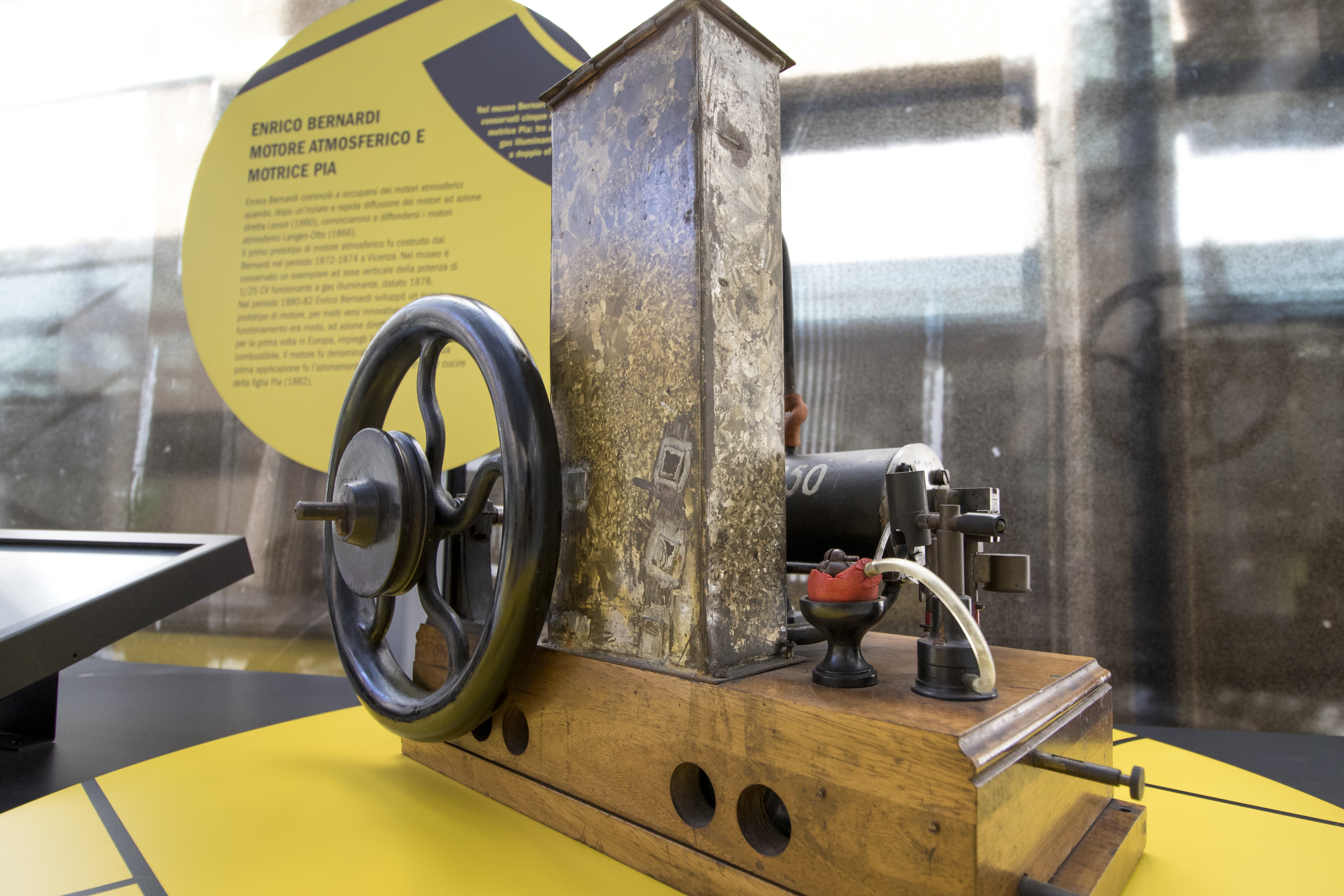
- Engine of La motrice Pia
- Manufacturer: Enrico Bernardi (inventor)
- Assembly: 1884 one-off
- Engine: 122.5 cc single-cylinder, water cooled, gasoline engine with cast iron cylinder
- Bore / stroke: 44 mm x 80.5 mm
- Power: 0.024 bhp at 200 rpm
- Frame type: Wooden tricycle
- Fuel capacity: 0.2 L (0.044 imp gal; 0.053 US gal)

The Motrice Pia was an early three-wheeled vehicle, introduced by Italian Enrico Bernardi, and credited as the first motorcycle by sources such as the Enciclopedia Italiana. The exact year of introduction depends on which one of the following milestones one considers: the demonstration of a gasoline engine in 1882–1884 (first used to power a sewing machine), the application of the engine to a child's tricycle in 1884, the application of this engine to a motorized tricycle (or low cart) in 1893, or the mounting of the motor behind a bicycle on a one-wheel trailer via chain drive creating a "motorcycle" in 1894.

== Specifications ==
Specifications in the box accompanying the article are from Museo Nicolis and refer to the 1884 tricycle.

== See also ==
- List of motorcycles of the 1890s
