= Steam tricycle =

Steam-driven three-wheeled vehicle

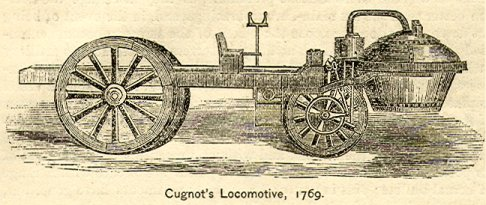
Cugnot's Steam Wagon, from a 19th-century engraving

A steam tricycle is a steam-driven three-wheeled vehicle.

== History ==
In the early days of motorized vehicle development, several experimenters built steam-powered vehicles with three wheels. The first steam tricycle – and probably the first true self-propelled land vehicle – was Nicolas-Joseph Cugnot's 1769 Fardier à vapeur (steam dray), a three-wheeled machine with a top speed of around 3 km/h (2 mph) originally designed for hauling artillery. Failing to meet the army's design criteria, no further development was undertaken.

The Long steam tricycle appears to be one of the earliest preserved examples, built by George A. Long around 1880 and patented sometime around 1882; an example is on display at the Smithsonian Institution.

In 1881 the Parkyns-Bateman steam tricycle was demonstrated in England. It used a petroleum-fired steam boiler (making it the first petroleum-powered vehicle), driving a double-acting two cylinder steam engine on the chassis of a Cheylesmore tricycle. Although numerous orders were reportedly placed, British law made such vehicles essentially illegal on public roads. An example was displayed in the Science Museum from 1912 to 1922.

A small steam tricycle was built by Albert, Comte de Dion in 1887. This had two wheels in the front, between which was mounted to the boiler, and a single rear wheel driven by the engine. It was fitted with pneumatic tires.

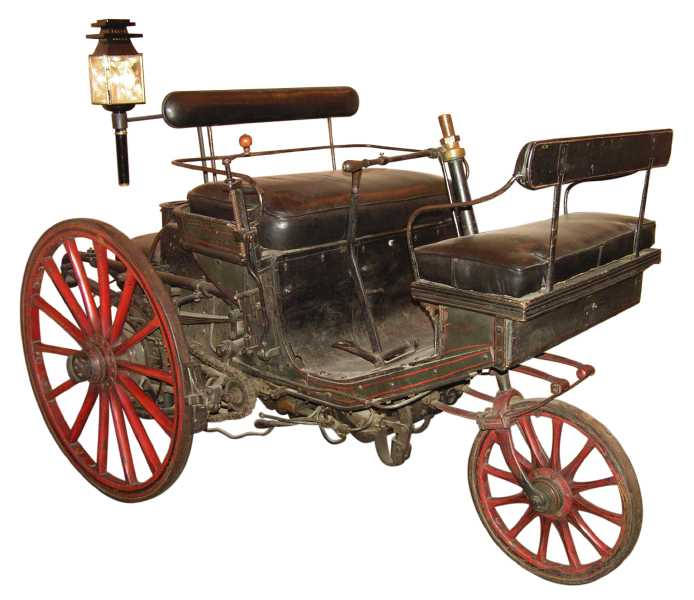
Léon Serpollet's coal-fired steam tricycle from 1888

In the same year Léon Serpollet also constructed a coal-fired steam tricycle, with the "steam generator" (boiler) mounted between two rear wheels. These and other experimenters also built four-wheeled steam-powered vehicles. The invention of the internal combustion engine led to the replacement of steam in most cases, although steam cars continue to be built to the present day in small numbers.

== Bibliography ==
- Singer, Charles Joseph; Raper, Richard. A history of technology : edited by Charles Singer ... [et al.]. Clarendon Press, 1954–1978. History e-book project.. ACLS Humanities E-book. Vol 5. Chapter 18. pp. 423–424.

== See also ==
- History of steam road vehicles
- Steamroller
- Steam tractor
- Timeline of transportation technology
- Traction engine
- List of motorized trikes
