= History of steam road vehicles =

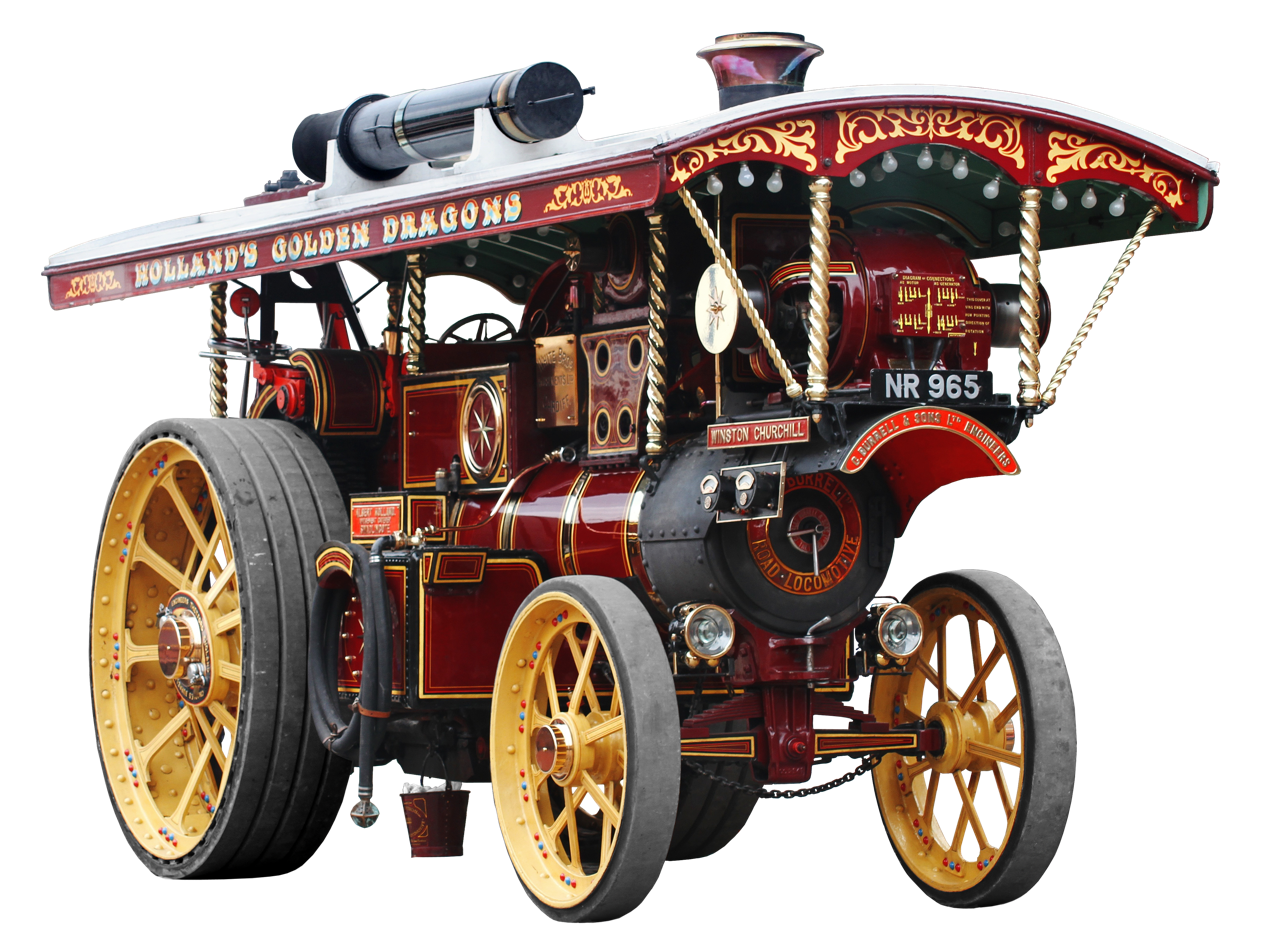
Steam-powered showman's engine from England

The history of steam road vehicles encompasses the development of vehicles powered by a steam engine for use on land and independent of rails, whether for conventional road use, such as the steam car and steam waggon, or for agricultural or heavy haulage work, such as the traction engine.

The first experimental vehicles were built in the 18th and 19th century, but it was not until after Richard Trevithick had developed the use of high-pressure steam, around 1800, that mobile steam engines became a practical proposition. The first half of the 19th century saw great progress in steam vehicle design, and by the 1850s it was viable to produce them on a commercial basis. This progress was dampened by legislation which limited or prohibited the use of steam-powered vehicles on roads. Nevertheless, the 1880s to the 1920s saw continuing improvements in vehicle technology and manufacturing techniques, and steam road vehicles were developed for many applications. In the 20th century, the rapid development of internal combustion engine technology led to the demise of the steam engine as a source of propulsion of vehicles on a commercial basis, with relatively few remaining in use beyond the Second World War.

Many of these vehicles were acquired by enthusiasts for preservation, and numerous examples are still in existence. In the 1960s, the air pollution problems in California gave rise to a brief period of interest in developing and studying steam-powered vehicles as a possible means of reducing the pollution. Apart from interest by steam enthusiasts, occasional replica vehicles, and experimental technology, no steam vehicles are in production at present.

Early steam-powered vehicles, which were uncommon but not rare, have considerable disadvantages as seen from a 21st-century viewpoint. They were slow to start, as water had to be boiled to generate the steam. They used a dirty fuel (coal) and put out dirty smoke. Fuel was bulky and had to be shoveled onto the vehicle and then into the firebox. Like a furnace, hot ash had to be removed and disposed of. The engine needed to be replenished with water in addition to fuel. Most vehicles had metal wheels and less than excellent traction. They were heavy. In most cases the user had to do their own maintenance. Top speed was low, about 20 miles (32 km) per hour, and acceleration was poor.

Steam vehicle technology evolved over time. Later steam vehicles used cleaner liquid fuel (kerosene), were fitted with rubber tyres and condensers to recover water, and were lighter overall. These improvements were not enough to keep pace with internal-combustion engines, however, which ultimately out-competed steam and remained dominant for the rest of the 20th century.

== Early pioneers ==
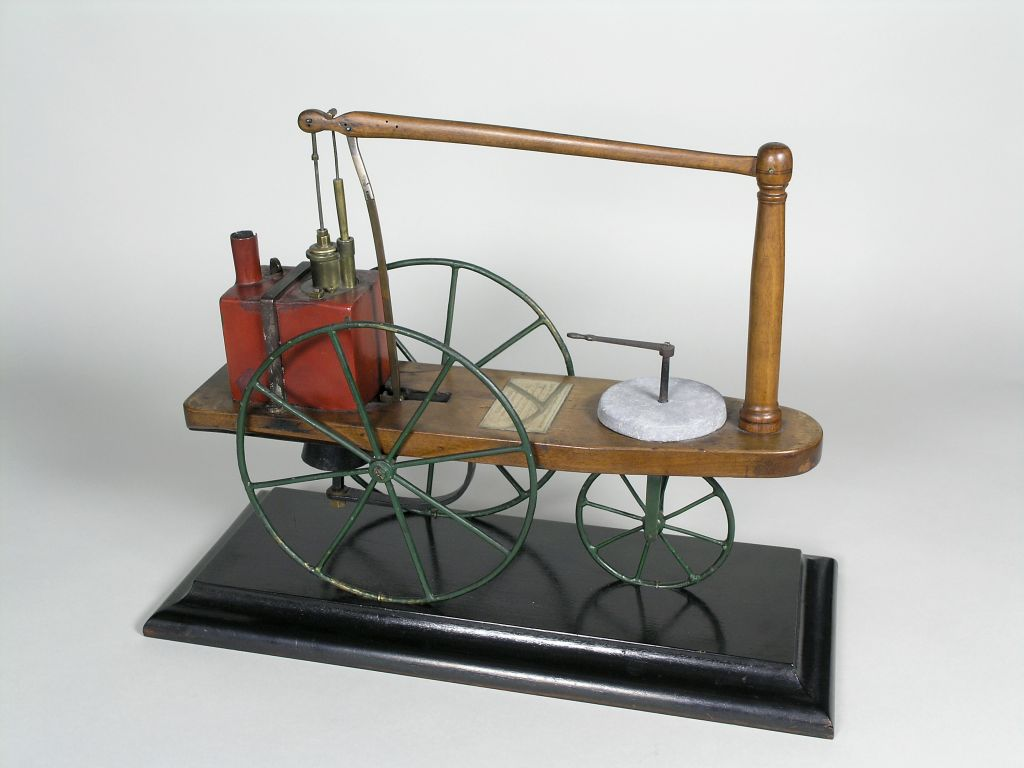
Murdoch's model steam carriage of 1784, now in Thinktank, Birmingham Science Museum

Early research on the steam engine before 1700 was closely linked to the quest for self-propelled vehicles and ships, the first practical applications from 1712 were stationary plant working at very low pressure which entailed engines of very large dimensions. The size reduction necessary for road transport meant an increase in steam pressure with all the attendant dangers, due to the inadequate boiler technology of the period. A strong opponent of high pressure steam was James Watt who along with Matthew Boulton did all he could to dissuade William Murdoch from developing and patenting his steam carriage built and operated in model form in 1784. In 1791 he built a larger steam carriage which he had to abandon to do other work.

During the latter part of the 18th century, there were numerous attempts to produce self-propelled steerable vehicles. Many remained in the form of models. Progress was dogged by many problems inherent to road vehicles in general, such as adequate road surfaces, suitable power plant giving steady rotative motion, tyres, vibration resistant bodywork, braking, suspension and steering among other issues. The extreme complexity of these issues can be said to have hampered progress over more than a hundred years, as much as hostile legislation.

=== Verbiest steam carriage ===
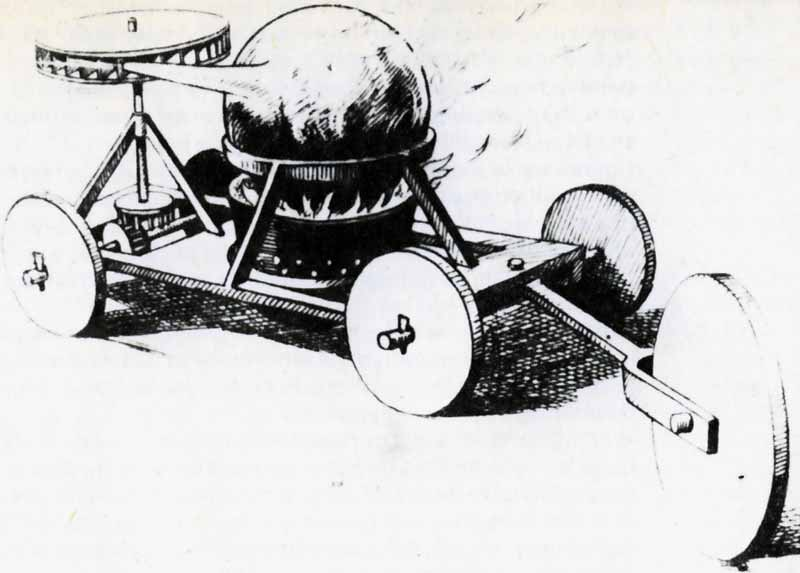
Steam carriage by Verbiest of 1679

Ferdinand Verbiest is suggested to have built what may have been the first steam carriage in about 1679, but very little concrete information on this is known to exist. It was not designed to carry a driver or goods as it was a small scale vehicle. It also seems that the Belgian vehicle served as an inspiration for the Italian Grimaldi (early 1700) and the French Nolet (1748) steam carriage successor.

=== Cugnot "Fardier à vapeur" ===
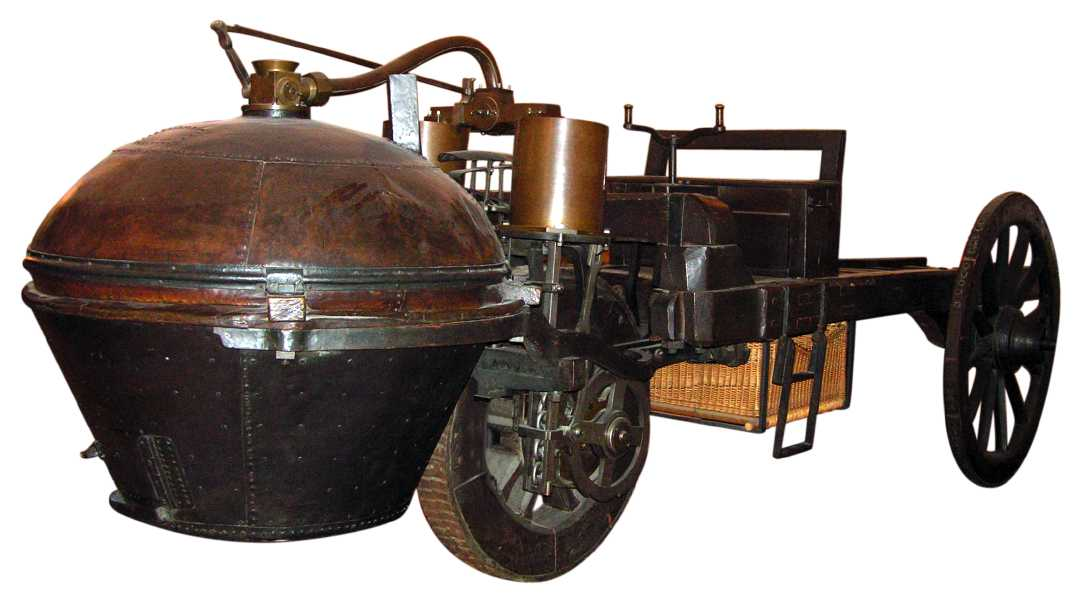
Cugnot's "Fardier à vapeur" ("Steam wagon") of 1769

Nicolas-Joseph Cugnot's "machine à feu pour le transport de wagons et surtout de l'artillerie" ("fire engine for transporting wagons and especially artillery") was built in two versions, one in 1769 and one in 1771 for use by the French Army. This was the first steam wagon that was not a toy, and that was known to exist. Cugnot's, fardier a term usually applied to a massive two-wheeled cart for exceptionally heavy loads, was intended to be capable of transporting 4 tonnes (3.9 tons), and of travelling at up to 4 km/h (2.5 mph). The vehicle was of tricycle layout, with two rear wheels and a steerable front wheel controlled by a tiller. There is considerable evidence, from the period, that this vehicle actually ran, making it probably the first to do so, however it remained a short lived experiment due to inherent instability and the vehicle's failure to meet the Army's specified performance level.

=== Symington steam carriage ===
In 1786 William Symington built a steam carriage.

=== Fourness and Ashworth steam car ===
A British patent No.1674 of December 1788 was granted for a steam car by Fourness and Ashworth.

=== Trevithick steam carriage ===
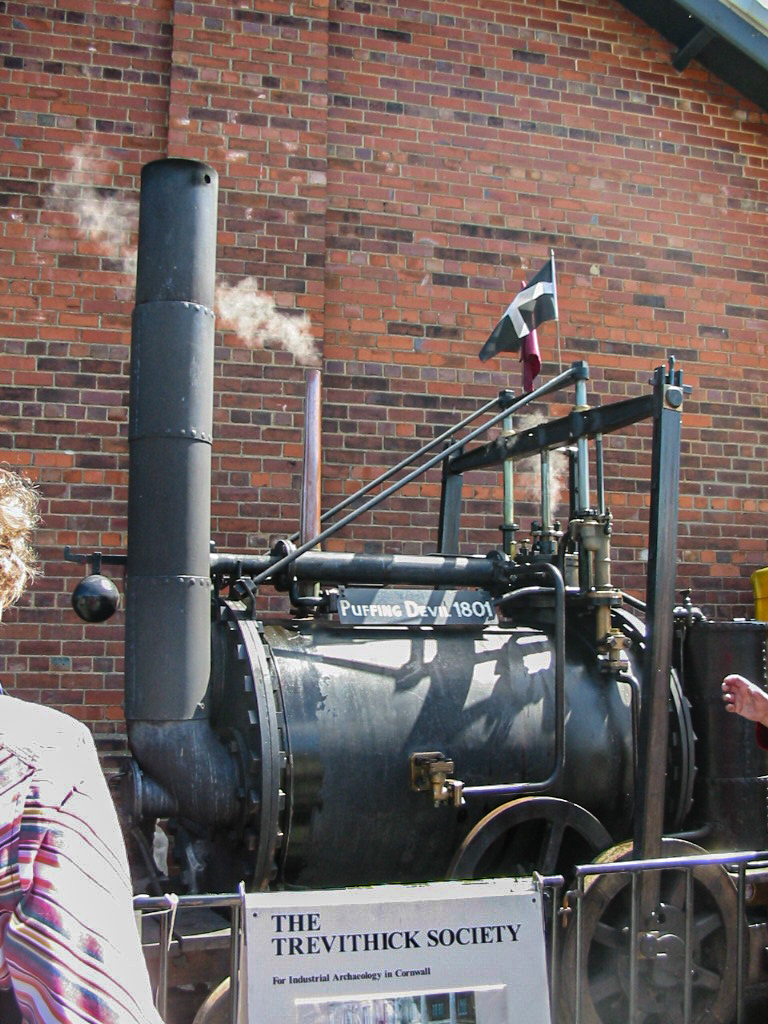
A replica of Trevithick's 1801 road locomotive Puffing Devil

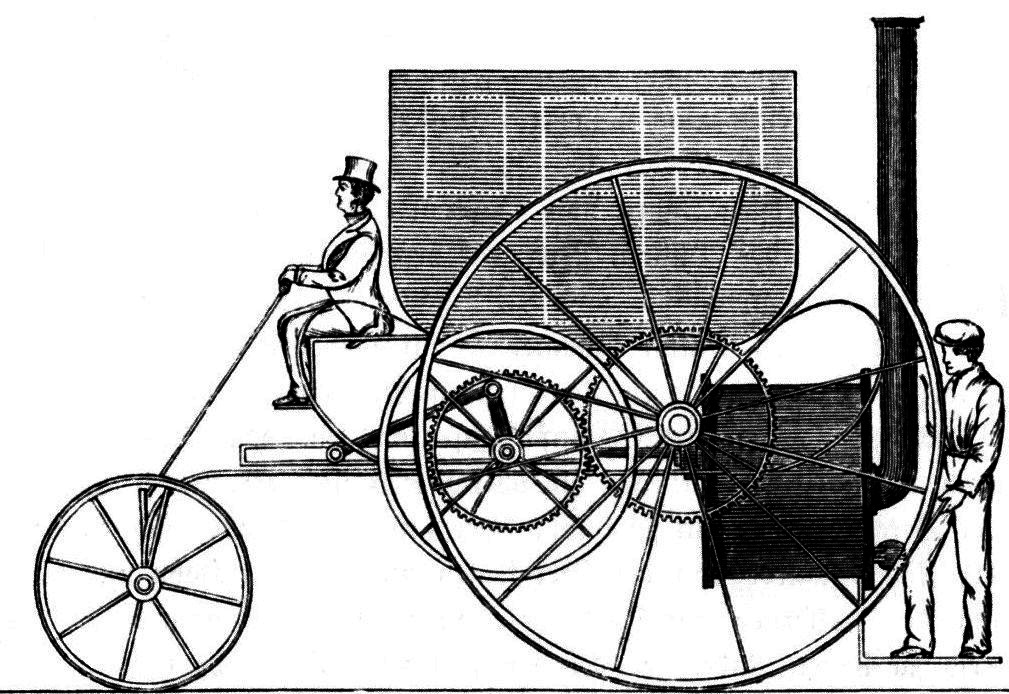
Trevithick's London Steam Carriage of 1803

In 1801 Richard Trevithick constructed an experimental steam-driven vehicle (Puffing Devil) which was equipped with a firebox enclosed within the boiler, with one vertical cylinder, the motion of the single piston being transmitted directly to the driving wheels by means of connecting rods. It was reported as weighing 1520 kg fully loaded, with a speed of 14.5 km/h (9.0 mph) on the flat. During its first trip it was left unattended and was "self destructed". Trevithick soon built the London Steam Carriage that ran successfully in London in 1803, but the venture failed to attract interest and soon folded up.

In the context of Trevithick's vehicle, an English writer by the name of "Mickleham" in 1822 coined the term Steam engine:

It exhibits in construction the most beautiful simplicity of parts, the most sagacious selection of appropriate forms, the most convenient and effective arrangement and connexion uniting strength with elegance, the necessary solidity with the greatest portability, possessing unlimited power with a wonderful pliancy to accommodate it to the varying resistance: it may indeed be called The steam engine.

=== Evans steam-powered amphibious craft ===
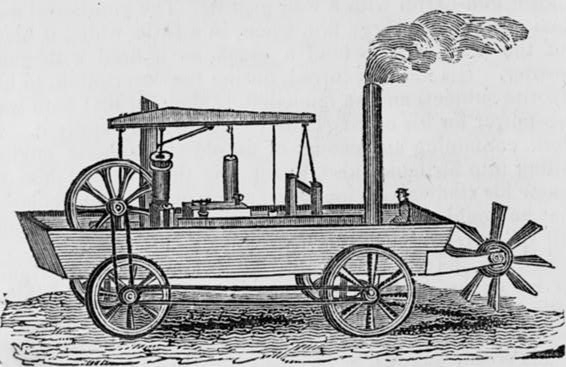
The Oruktor amphibolos by Evans of 1805

In 1805 Oliver Evans built the Oruktor amphibolos (literally Amphibious digger), a steam-powered, flat bottomed dredger that he modified to be self-propelled on both water and land. It is widely believed to be the first amphibious vehicle, and the first steam-powered road vehicle to run in the United States. However, no designs for the machine survive, and the only accounts of its achievements come from Evans himself. Later analysis of Evans's descriptions suggests that the 5 hp (3.7 kW) engine was unlikely to have been powerful enough to move the vehicle either on land or water, and that the chosen route for its demonstration would have had the benefit of gravity, river currents and tides to assist with the vehicles' progress. The dredger was not a success, and after a few years lying idle, was dismantled for parts.

=== Summers and Ogle steam carriage ===
In around 1830 or 1831 Summers and Ogle based at the Iron Foundry, Millbrook, Southampton, made two three-wheeled steam carriages.

In 1831 the firm's Nathaniel Ogle gave evidence on the steam carriage to the "Select Committee of the House of Commons on Steam Carriages".

In 1832 one of their steam carriages travelled via Oxford to Birmingham and Liverpool.

A June 1833 newspaper report described a demonstration in London:

On Saturday last Mr Nathaniel Ogle, accompanied by several ladies, together with Mr G Burdett, Mr Macgary, Mr C Bischoff, Mr Babbage and other gentlemen, proceeded by his steam carriage from the Bazaar in King street, Portman square to call on Mr Rothschild at his residence at Stamford hill. The vehicle, although it has been rattled over the roads nearly six hundred miles, is in efficient condition. A small quantity of waste steam was perceptible at first, until the boilers and casing were hot. The distance, full seven miles, was cleared, not withstanding the crowded state of the roads, in thirty one minutes, and the sudden and narrow ascent to Mr Rothschild's made with perfect precision, which was hardly to be expected from so long and ponderous a vehicle. The party was most urbanely and kindly received by Mrs and Mr Rothschild, and after having partaken of refreshments returned to Baker street.

== Early steam carriage services ==
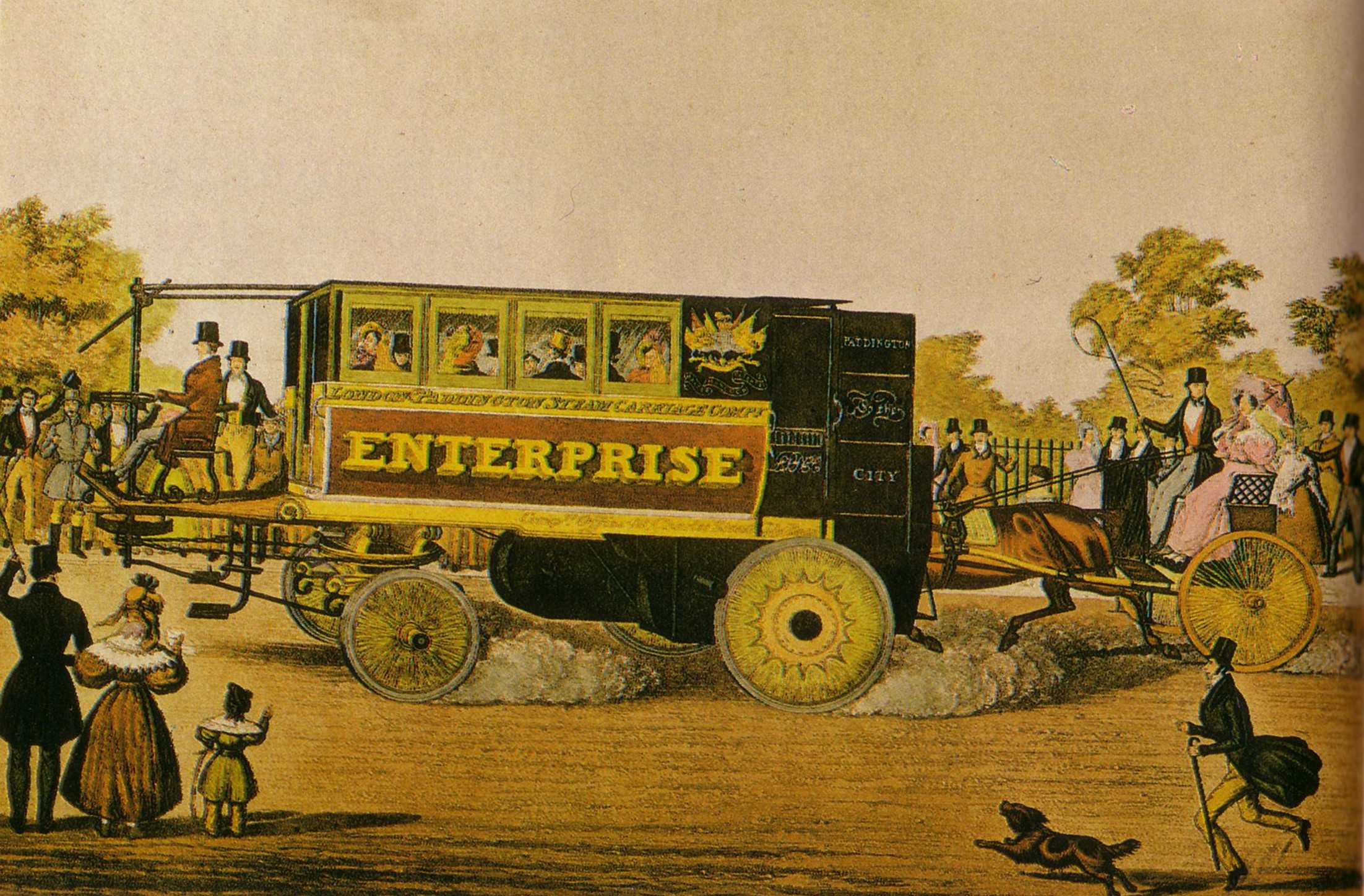
Hancock's Enterprise steam bus of 1833

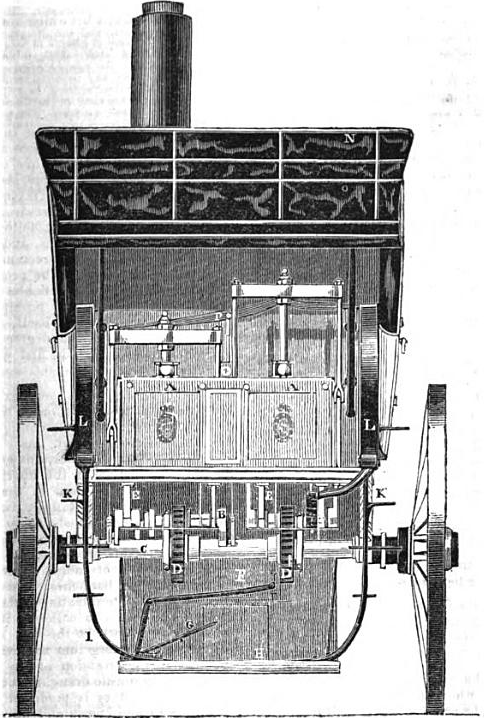
Russell's steam carriage with boiler below the axle and two pistons in 1834

More commercially successful for a time than Trevithick's carriage were the steam carriage services operated in England in the 1830s, principally by associates of Sir Goldsworthy Gurney and by Walter Hancock among others and in Scotland by John Scott Russell. However, the turnpikes charged heavy tolls which made such services uneconomic. A Select Committee of the House of Commons reported in 1831:

These inquiries have led the Committee to believe that the substitution of inanimate for animal power, in draught on common roads, is one of the most important improvements in the means of internal communication ever introduced. Its practicability they consider to have been fully established...

Many circumstances, however, must retard the general introduction of steam as a substitute for horse-power on roads. One very formidable obstacle will arise from the prejudices which always beset a new invention, especially one which will at first appear detrimental to the interests of so many individuals...

Mr. Gurney has given the following specimens of the oppressive rates of tolls adopted in several of these acts. On the Liverpool and Prescot Road, Mr. Gurney’s carriage would be charged £2 8s, while a loaded stage coach would pay only 4s. On the Bathgate Road the same carriage would be charged £1 7s 1d, while a coach drawn by four horses would pay 5s...

The Committee recommended a Bill to regulate the tolls to be charged for mechanical vehicles. These were not adopted, and the use of steam vehicles on the road consequently ceased. Horse traction retained its monopoly on fast transport in Britain until the railways took over from the late 1830s.

Sir James C. Anderson and his engineering partner Jasper Wheeler Rogers were the first to bring steam-propulsion vehicles to Ireland. Rogers and Anderson created their versions of these devices in the 1830s and early 1840s where they advocated for an island-wide conveyance network that would use Ireland's mail coach roads. An 1838 Cork Southern Reporter article on Anderson's "steam drag, or carriage for common roads" recounts how Anderson and his father (both of Buttevant Castle) spent "a fortune in building twenty-nine unsuccessful carriages to succeed in the thirtieth." Jasper Rogers built his Irish steam-driven cars in a former flint-glass factory, Fort Chrystal, located on what is now known as Dublin's East Wall.

Accompanying Rogers' and Anderson's interests in improvements in Irish conveyance of goods and people, they particularly advocated steam-propelled individual vehicles because the operators, road network staff, and work crews needed to maintain the system were much more encompassing than those used by a railway system alone, at a time when Rogers and Anderson were trying to maximize Irish wage employment. They could see that their immediate competitor, the railway, would greatly diminish labor needs within Ireland's transportation infrastructures. Similarly, a national railway system would contract, rather than expand, inner-island travel destinations. Rogers' and Anderson's steam-vehicle system called for numerous way-stations for refueling and supplying fresh water, and at the same time, these stations could house a "road police" as well as telegraph depots. Essentially most Irish villages, no matter how remote, would participate in this grand steam-vehicle network. Locals would be able to earn extra money by carrying rocks to the fuel stations, rocks that would be used to build, repair, or maintain the roadways. In addition, every village would require a local road repair crew.

== Military application of steam road vehicles ==
During the Crimean War (1853–1856) a traction engine was used to pull multiple open trucks.

In the 1870s many armies experimented with steam tractors pulling road trains of supply wagons.

By 1898 steam traction engine trains with up to four wagons were employed in military manoeuvres in England.

In 1900 John Fowler & Co. provided armoured road trains for use by the British forces in the Second Boer War.

== Victorian age of steam ==
Although engineers developed ingenious steam-powered road vehicles, they did not enjoy the same level of acceptance and expansion as steam power at sea and on the railways in the middle and late 19th century of the "age of steam".

Ransomes built a portable steam engine, that is a farm steam engine on wheels, hauled from farm to farm by horses in 1841. The next year Ransomes automated it and had the engine drive itself to farms.

Harsh legislation virtually eliminated mechanically propelled vehicles from the roads of Great Britain for 30 years, the Locomotive Act 1861 imposing restrictive speed limits on "road locomotives" of 5 mph (8.0 km/h) in towns and cities, and 10 mph (16 km/h) in the country. The Locomotives Act 1865 (the famous Red Flag Act) further reduced the speed limits to 4 mph (6.4 km/h) in the country and just 2 mph (3.2 km/h) in towns and cities, additionally requiring a man bearing a red flag (red lantern during the hours of darkness) to precede every vehicle. At the same time, the act gave local authorities the power to specify the hours during which any such vehicle might use the roads. The sole exceptions were street trams which from 1879 onwards were authorised under licence from the Board of Trade.

In France the situation was radically different from the extent of the 1861 ministerial ruling formally authorising the circulation of steam vehicles on ordinary roads. Whilst this led to considerable technological advances throughout the 1870s and 1880s, steam vehicles nevertheless remained a rarity.

To an extent competition from the successful railway network reduced the need for steam vehicles. From the 1860s onwards, attention was turned more to the development of various forms of traction engine which could either be used for stationary work such as sawing wood and threshing, or for transporting outsize loads too voluminous to go by rail. Steam trucks were also developed but their use was generally confined to the local distribution of heavy materials such as coal and building materials from railway stations and ports.

=== Rickett of Buckingham steam car ===
In 1854 Thomas Rickett of Buckingham built the first of several steam cars and in 1858 he built the second. Instead of looking like a steam car it resembled a small locomotive. It consisted of a steam engine mounted on three wheels: two large driven rear wheels and one smaller front wheel by which the vehicle was steered. The weight of the machine was 1.5 tonnes and somewhat lighter than Rickett's steam car. The whole was driven by a chain drive and a maximum speed of twelve miles per hour was reached.

Two years later in 1860 Rickett built a similar but heavier vehicle. This model incorporated spur-gear drive instead of chain. In his final design resembling a railway locomotive, the cylinders were coupled directly outside the cranks of the driving-axle.

=== Roper steam car ===
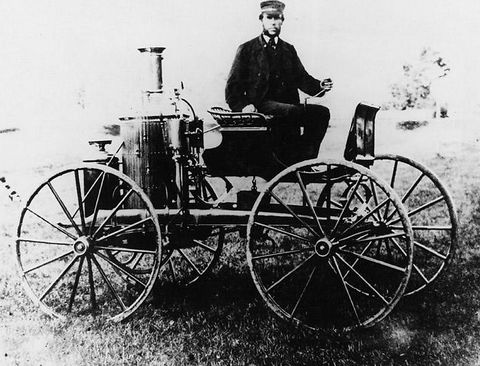
Roper and a steam car made sometime before 1870

Sylvester H. Roper drove around Boston, Massachusetts on a steam car he invented in 1863. One of his 1863 steam cars went to the Henry Ford Museum, where in 1972 it was the oldest car in the collection. Around 1867–1869 he built a steam velocipede, which may have been the first motorcycle. Roper died in 1896 of heart failure while testing a later version of his steam motorcycle.

=== Manzetti steam car ===
In 1864 Italian inventor Innocenzo Manzetti built a road steamer. It had the boiler at the front and a single cylinder engine.

=== Holt Road steamer ===
H.P. Holt constructed a small road steamer in 1866. Able to reach a speed of twenty miles per hour on level roads, it had a vertical boiler at the rear and two separate twin cylinder engines, each of which drove one rear wheel by means of a chain and sprocket wheels.

=== Taylor Steam buggy ===
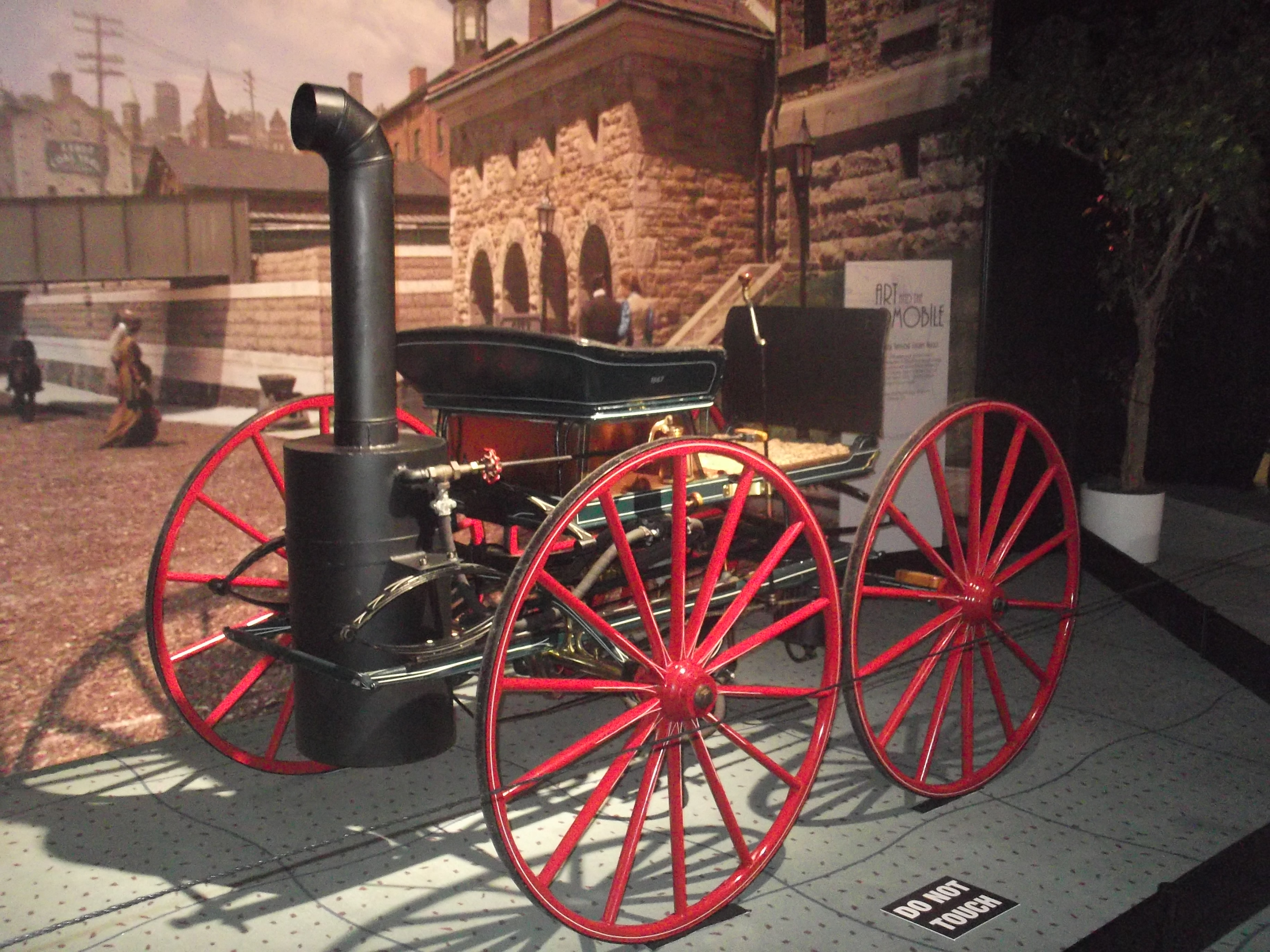
Taylor's Steam buggy of 1867

In 1867 Canadian jeweller Henry Seth Taylor demonstrated his four-wheeled steam buggy at the Stanstead Fair in Stanstead, Quebec, and again the following year. The basis of the buggy which he began building in 1865 was a high wheeled carriage with bracing to support a two-cylinder steam engine mounted on the floor.

=== Michaux-Perreaux Steam velocipede ===
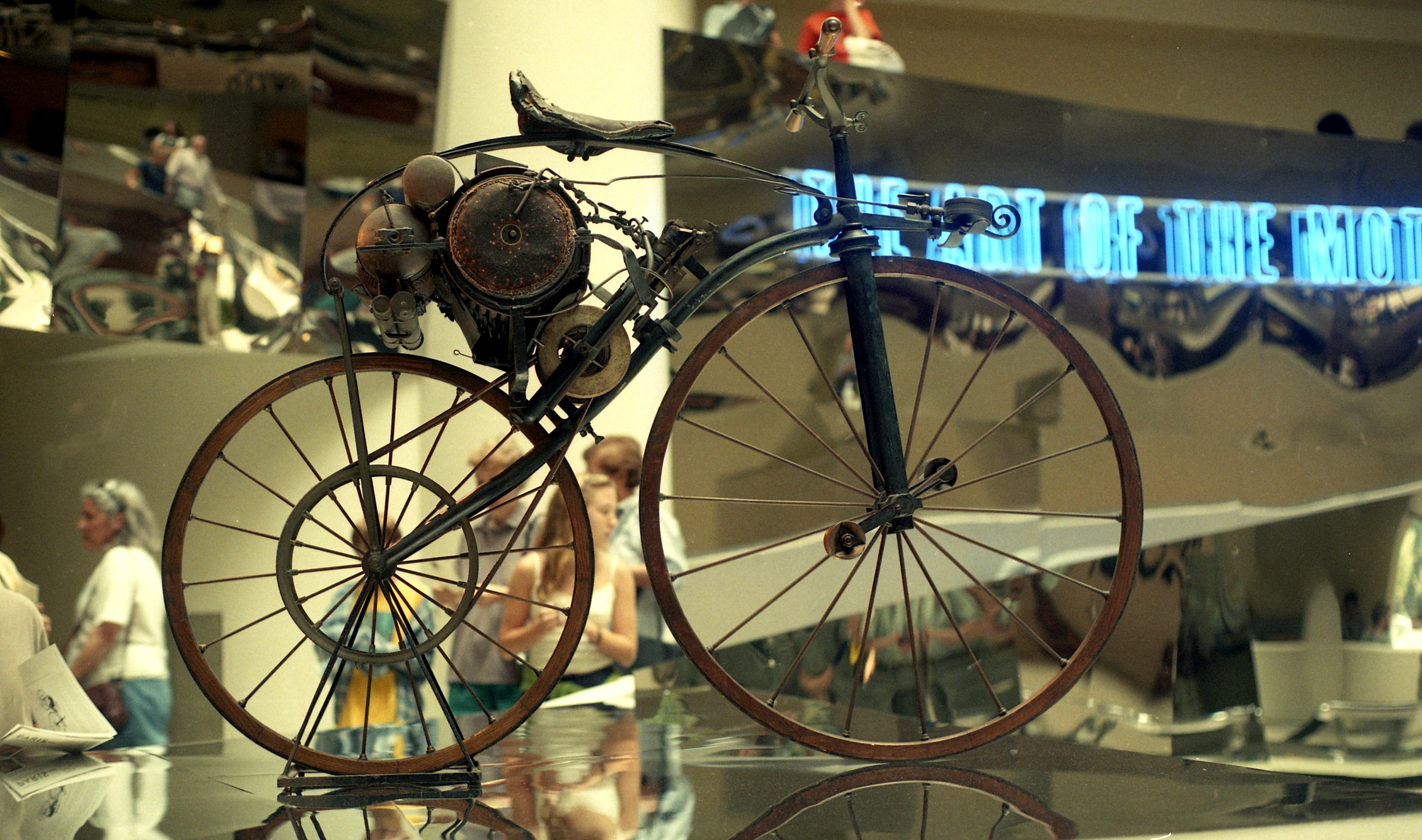
Michaux-Perreaux Steam velocipede on display at The Art of the Motorcycle exhibition at the Guggenheim in New York in 1998

Around 1867–1869 in France a Louis-Guillaume Perreaux commercial steam engine was attached to a Pierre Michaux metal framed velocipede, creating the Michaux-Perreaux steam velocipede. Along with the Roper steam velocipede, it might have been the first motorcycle. The only Michaux-Perreaux Steam velocipede made is in the Musée de l'Île-de-France, Sceaux, and was included in The Art of the Motorcycle exhibition in New York in 1998.

=== Knight of Farnham steam carriage ===
In 1868–1870 John Henry Knight of Farnham built a four-wheeled steam carriage which originally only had a single-cylinder engine.

=== Catley and Ayres of York steam car ===
In 1869 a small three-wheeled vehicle propelled by a horizontal twin cylinder engine which drove the rear axle by spur gearing, only one rear wheel was driven, the other turning freely on the axle. A vertical fire-tube boiler was mounted at the rear with a polished copper casing over the fire box and chimney, the boiler was enclosed in a mahogany casing. The weight was only 19 cwt and the front wheel was used for steering.

=== Thomson of Edinburgh Road steamer ===
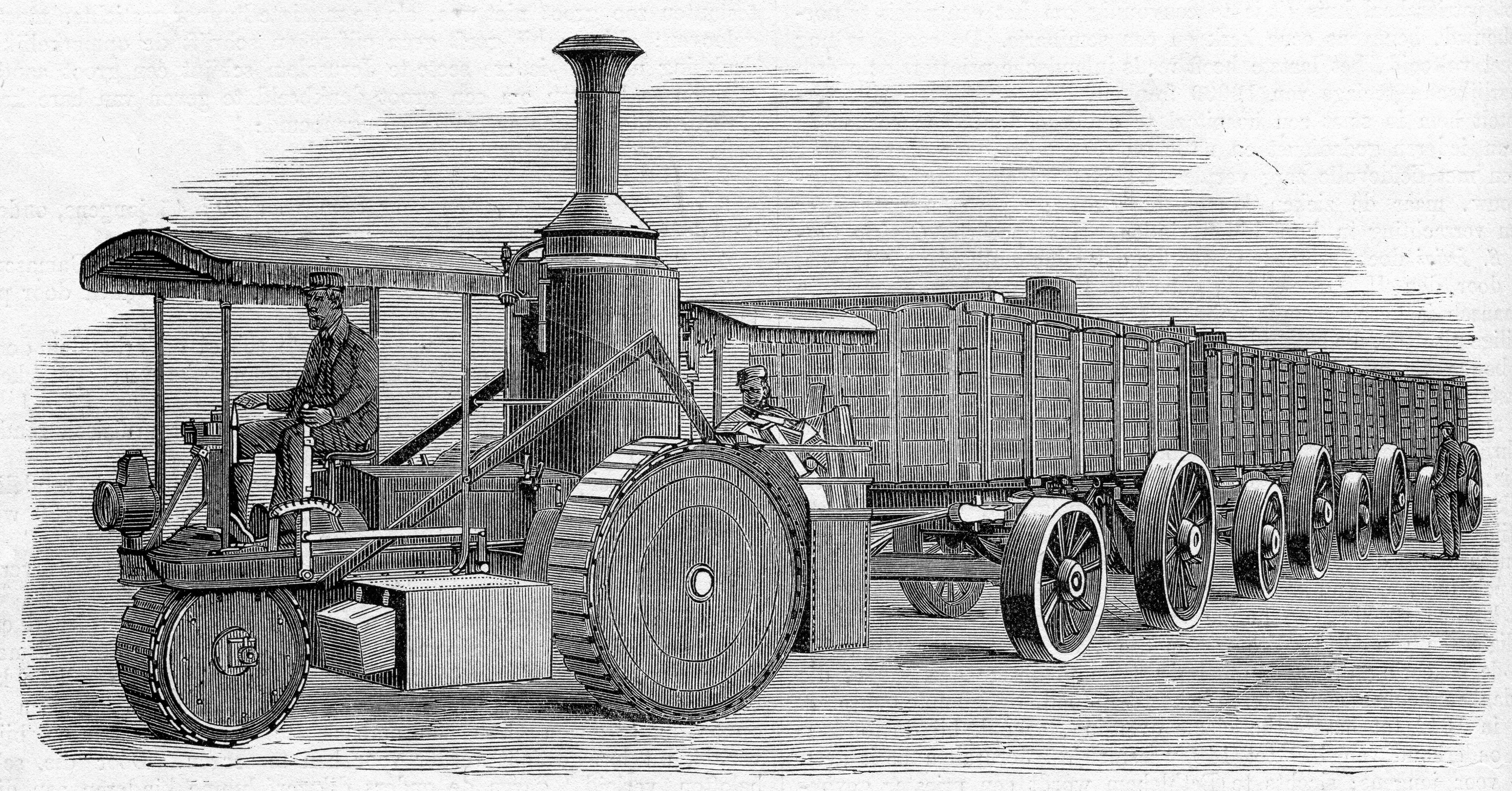
Thomson's Road steamer with charcoal wagons (engraving of 1870)

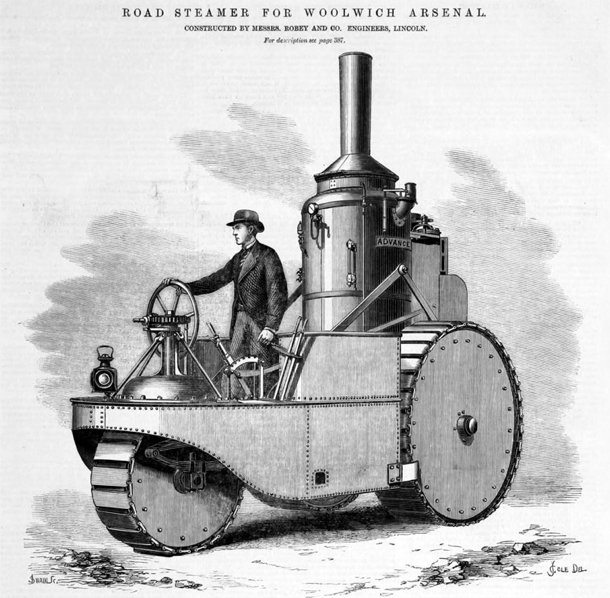
Robey's Road steamer built to Thomson's design

In 1869 the road steamer built by Robert William Thomson of Edinburgh became famous because its wheels were shod with heavy solid rubber tyres. Thomson's first road steamers, manufactured in his own small workshop in Leith, were fitted with three wheels, the small single wheel at the front being directly below the steering wheel. The tyres, which were 125 mm (4.92 in) thick, were corrugated internally and adhered to the wheel by friction. He then turned to T. M. Tennant and Co of Bowershall Iron and Engine Works, Leith for their manufacture, but as they could not keep up with demand in 1870 some of the production was moved to Robey & Co of Lincoln. Over the next two years Robeys built 32 of these vehicles, which were either 8 or 12 horsepower (6.0 or 8.9 kW) versions. A large proportion were exported. These included one to Italy (for an experiment of public transport in Bergamo), three to Austria (Vienna) and others to Turkey, Australia, New Zealand, India, Ireland, Chile, Russia (Moscow) and Greece. A further Thomson steam vehicle was built in 1877, but apart from traction engines, Robeys appear to have discontinued making road steam vehicles until 1904, when they started manufacturing steam road lorries.

=== Kemna of East-Prussia Road steamer ===
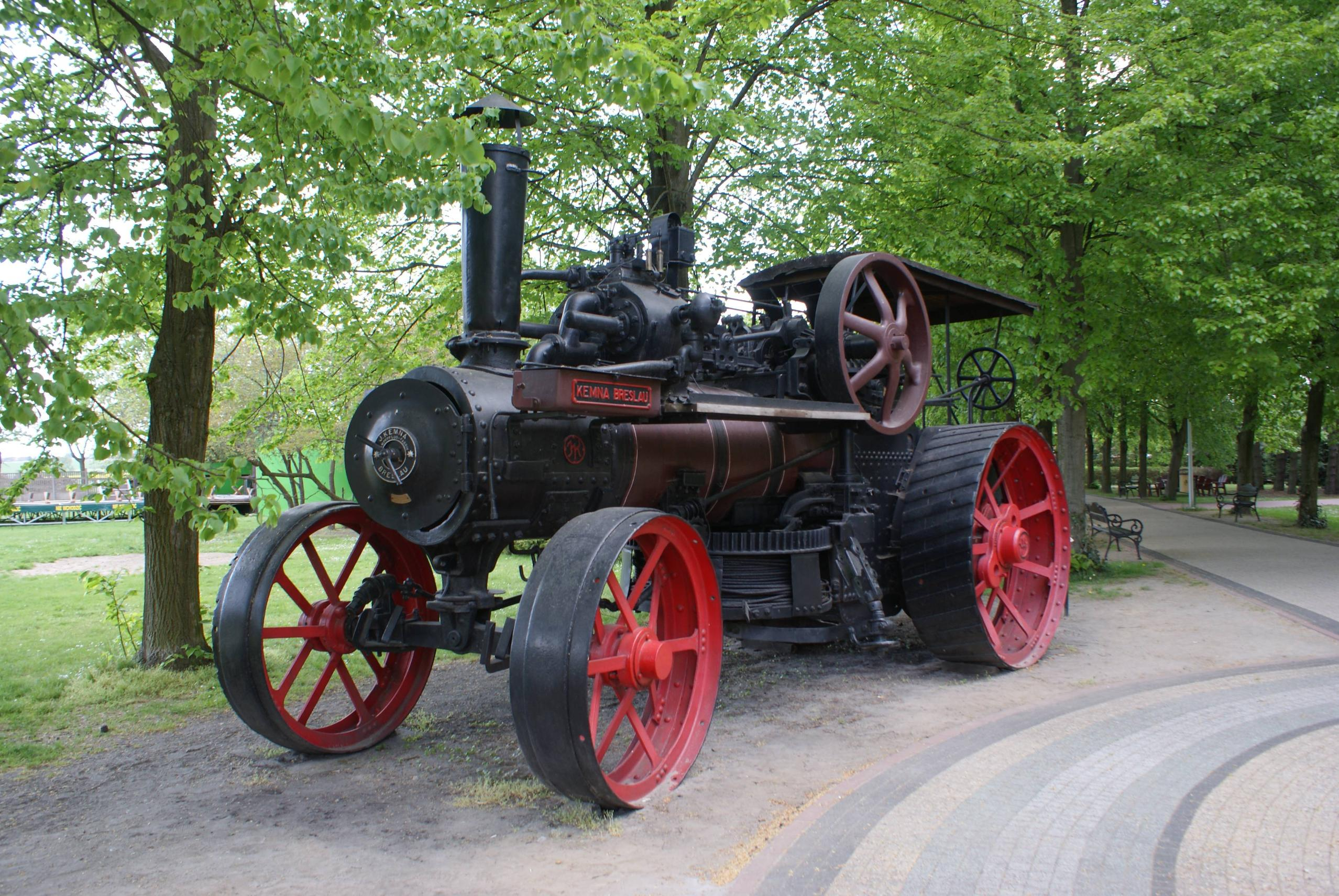
An early Kemna Steam ploughing engine

In 1871 Julius Kemna, a German industrialist, started selling English steam threshing systems. A couple of years later Kemna started producing various other steam-powered vehicles (such as road rollers) but also high quality steam ploughing engines and road steamers.

=== Randolph of Glasgow Steam bus ===
In 1872 a steam coach by Charles Randolph of Glasgow weighed four and a half long tons (5.0 short tons; 4.6 t), was 15 feet (4.57 m) in length, but had a maximum speed of only six miles per hour (9.7 km/h). Two vertical twin cylinder engines were independent of one another and each drove one of the rear wheels by spur gearing. The entire vehicle was enclosed and fitted with windows all around, carried six people, and even had two driving mirrors for observing traffic approaching from behind, the earliest recorded instance of such a device.

=== Bollée Steam bus ===
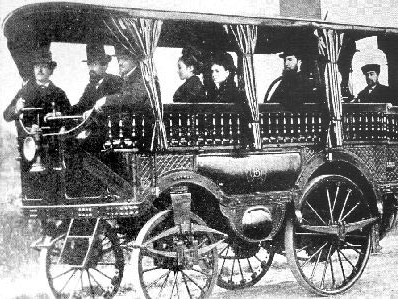
Bollée's L'Obéissante steam bus photographed in 1875

From 1873 to 1883 Amédée Bollée of Le Mans built a series of steam-powered passenger vehicles able to carry 6 to 12 people at speeds up to 60 km/h (37 mph), with such names as La Rapide, La Nouvelle, La Marie-Anne, La Mancelle and L'Obéissante. To L'Obeissante the boiler was mounted behind the passenger compartment with the engine at the front of the vehicle, driving the differential through a shaft with chain drive to the rear wheels. The driver sat behind the engine and steered by means of a wheel mounted on a vertical shaft. The lay out more closely resembled much later motor cars than other steam vehicles. Moreover, in 1873 it had independent suspension on all four corners.

=== Grenville of Glastonbury steam car ===
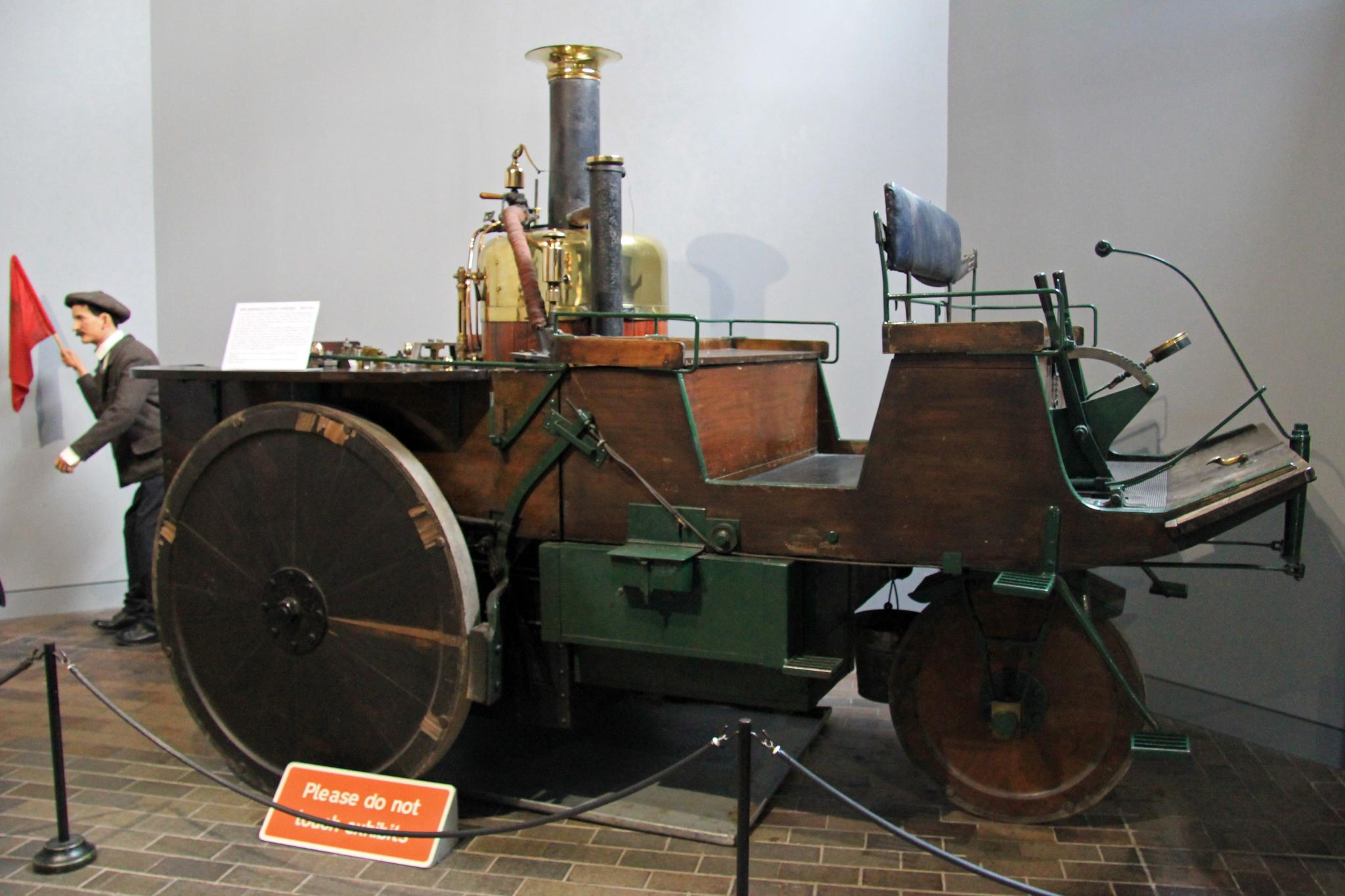
Grenville's steam car of 1875–1880

In 1875–1880 R. Neville Grenville of Glastonbury constructed a 3-wheeled steam vehicle which travelled a maximum of 15 miles per hour (24 km/h). This vehicle is still in existence, preserved for many years in the Bristol Museum & Art Gallery but since 2012 at the National Motor Museum, Beaulieu.

=== Cederholm of Sweden steam car ===
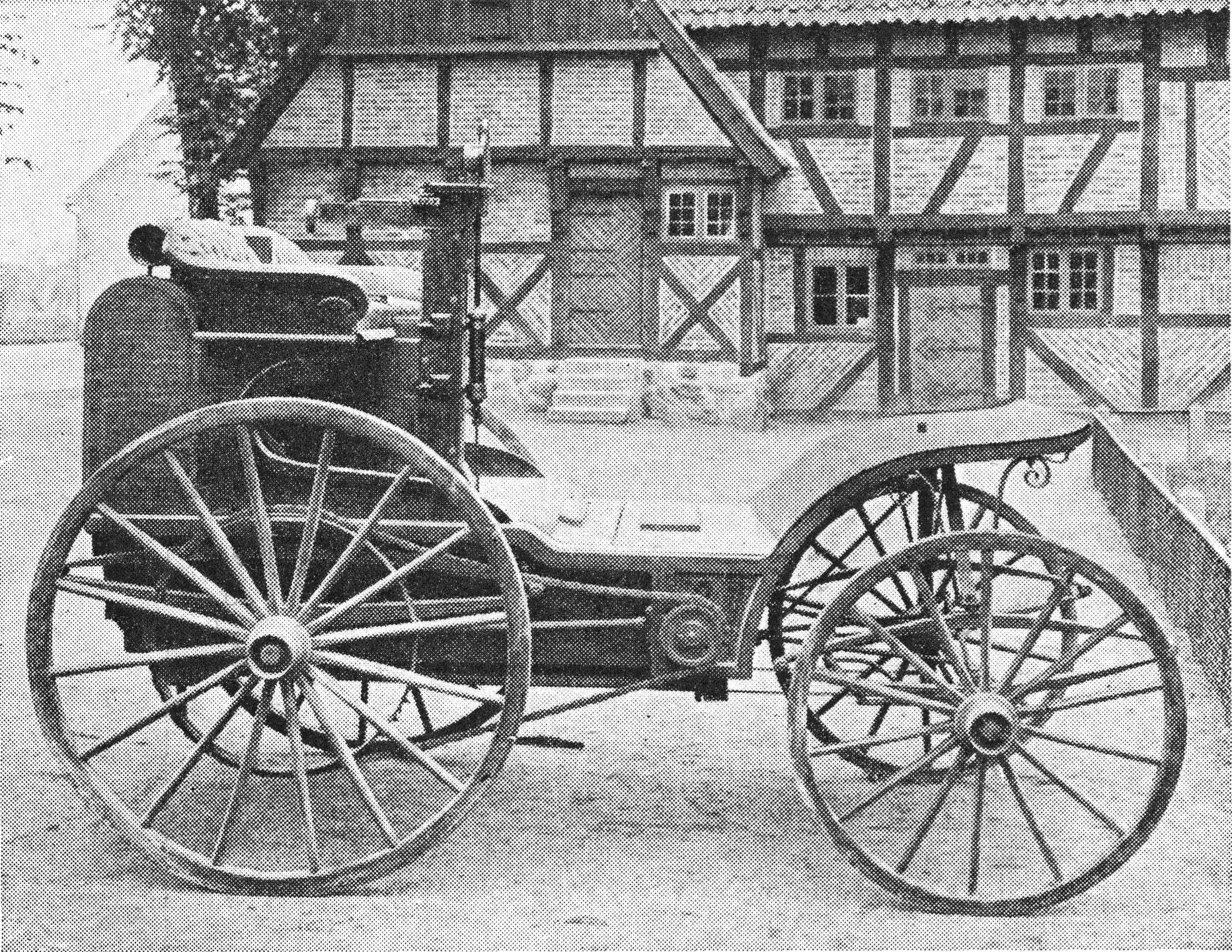
Cederholm's steam car in 1892

In 1892 painter Joens Cederholm and his brother, André, a blacksmith, designed their first car, a two-seater, introducing a condenser in 1894. It was not a success.

=== Shearer of South Australia steam car ===
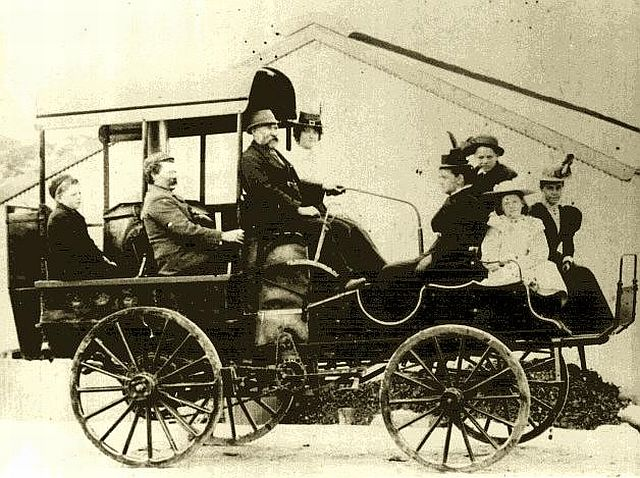
Shearer's steam car in 1898

Starting in 1894 David Shearer designed and built the first car in Australia. It was capable of 15 miles per hour (24 km/h) on the streets of Adelaide, South Australia. The boiler was his own design, being a horizontal boiler of the semi flash type. Steering was by a tiller type design and a photograph of the vehicle shows it carrying eight passengers. The news article on the car has a sectional drawing of the design. The car's first official road trial was in 1899.

=== De Dion & Bouton Steam vehicles ===
See steam tricycle

The development by Léon Serpollet of the flash steam boiler brought about the appearance of various diminutive steam tricycles and quadricycles during the late 1880s and early 1890s, notably by de Dion and Bouton, these successfully competed in long-distance races but soon met with stiff competition for public favour from the internal combustion engine cars being developed, notably by Peugeot, that quickly cornered most of the popular market. In the face of the flood of IC cars, proponents of the steam car had to fight a long rear guard battle that was to last into modern times.

=== Locomobile Company of America ===
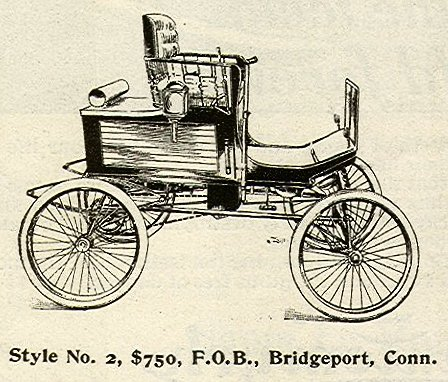
Locomobile steam car from a January 1901 advertisement

This American firm bought the patents from the Stanley brothers and began building their steam buggies from 1898 to 1905. Locomobile Company of America went into building gas cars and lasted until the Depression.

=== Stanley Motor Carriage Company ===
In 1902 the twins Francis E. Stanley (1849–1918) and Freelan O. Stanley formed the Stanley Motor Carriage Company. They made famous models such as the 1906 Stanley Rocket, 1908 Stanley K Raceabout and 1923 Stanley Steam Car.

== Early to mid-20th century ==
In 1906 the land speed record was broken by a Stanley steam car, piloted by Fred Marriott, which achieved 127 mph (204 km/h) at Ormond Beach, Florida. This annual week-long "Speed Week" was the forerunner of today's Daytona 500. This record was not exceeded by any land vehicle until 1910, and stood as the steam-powered world speed record till 25 August 2009.

=== Doble steam car ===
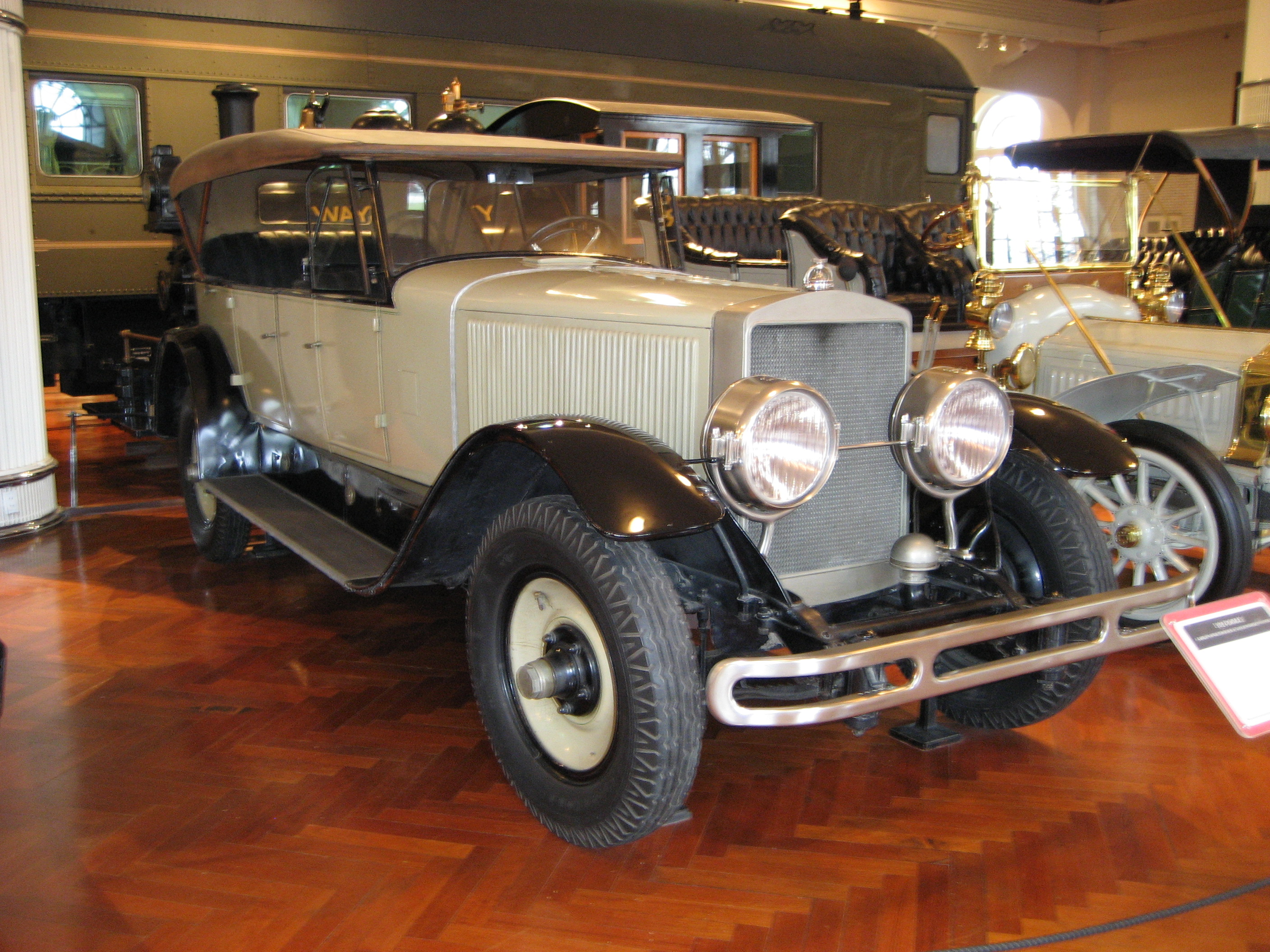
1924 Doble Model E steam car

Attempts were made to bring more advanced steam cars on the market, the most remarkable being the Doble Steam Car which shortened start up time very noticeably by incorporating a highly efficient mono tube steam generator to heat a much smaller quantity of water along with effective automation of burner and water feed control. By 1923 Doble's steam cars could be started from cold with the turn of a key and driven off in 40 seconds or less.

=== Paxton Phoenix steam car ===
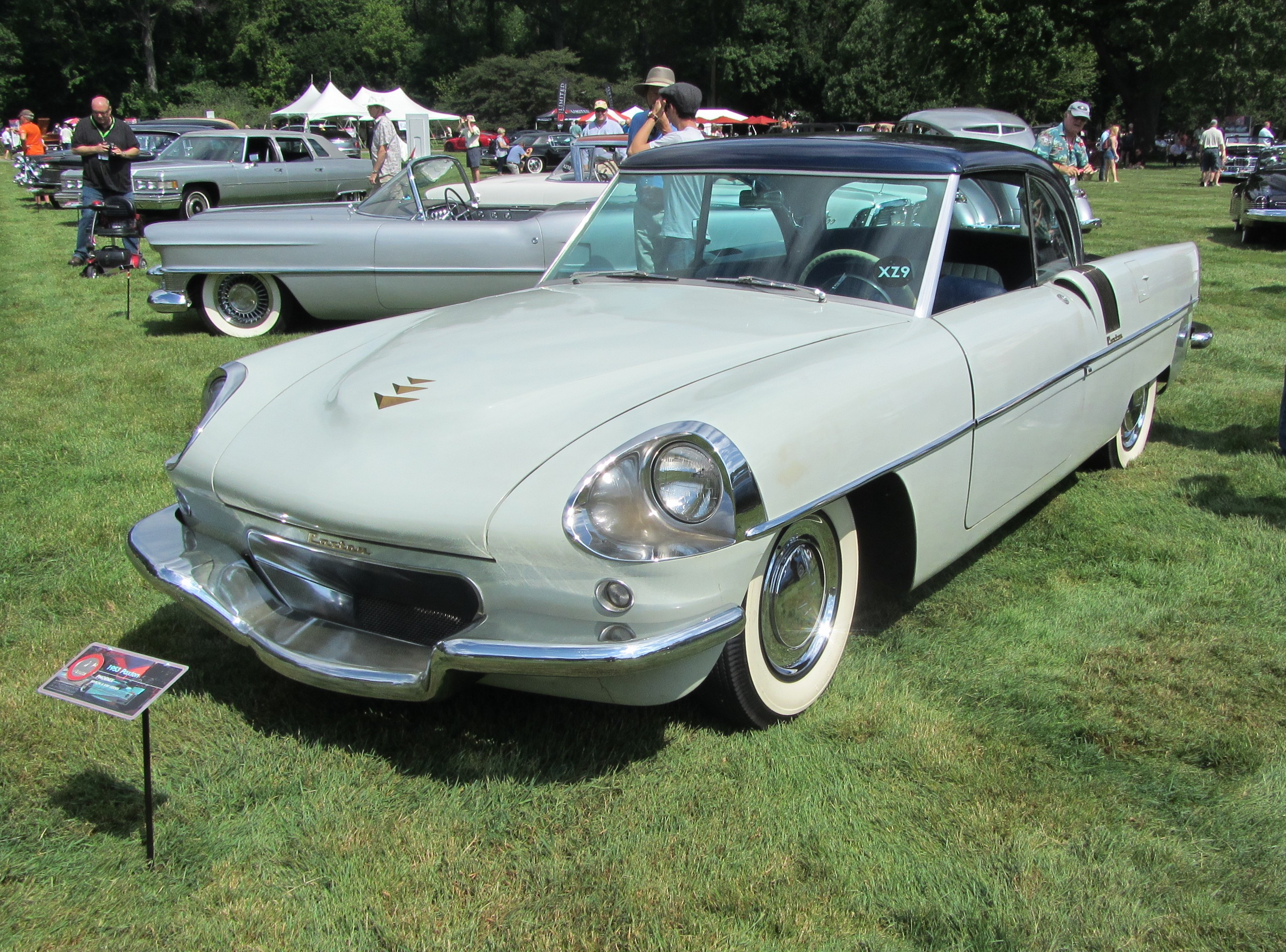
1953 Paxton Phoenix steam car

Abner Doble developed the Doble Ultimax engine for the Paxton Phoenix steam car, built by the Paxton Engineering Division of McCulloch Motors Corporation, Los Angeles. Its sustained maximum power was 120 bhp (89 kW). The project was eventually dropped in 1954.

=== Decline of steam car development ===
Steam cars became less popular after the adoption of the electric starter, which eliminated the need for risky hand cranking to start gasoline-powered cars. The introduction of assembly-line mass production by Henry Ford, which hugely reduced the cost of owning a conventional automobile, was also a strong factor in the steam car's demise as the Model T was both cheap and reliable.

== Late 20th century ==
See steam car#Air pollution, fuel crises, resurgence and enthusiasts

=== Renewed interest ===
In 1968 renewed interest was shown, sometimes prompted by newly available techniques. Some of these designs used safer and more responsive water-tube boilers. A prototype car was built by Charles J. & Calvin E. Williams of Ambler, Pennsylvania. Other high-performance steam cars were built by Richard J. Smith of Midway City, California, and A.M. and E. Pritchard of Caulfeld, Australia. Companies/organisations as Controlled Steam Dynamics of Mesa, Arizona, General Motors, Thermo-Electron Corp. of Waltham, Massachusetts, and Kinetics Inc., of Sarasota, Florida all built high-performance steam engines in the same period. Bill Lear also started work on a closed circuit steam turbine to power cars and buses, and built a transit bus and converted a Chevrolet Monte Carlo sedan to use this turbine system. It used a proprietary working fluid dubbed Learium, possibly a chlorofluorocarbon similar to DuPont Freon.

In 1970 a variant of the steam car was made by Wallace L. Minto, which works on Ucon U-113 fluorocarbon as the working fluid instead of water. The car was called the Minto car.

=== Land speed record ===
On 25 August 2009 a team of British engineers from Hampshire ran their steam-powered car "Inspiration" at Edwards Air Force Base in the Mojave Desert, and averaged 139.84 mph (225.05 km/h) over two runs, driven by Charles Burnett III. The car was 7.62 m (25 ft 0 in) long and weighed 3,000 kg (6,614 lb), built from carbon fibre and aluminium and contained 12 boilers with over 2 miles (3.2 km) of steam tubing.

== Gallery ==
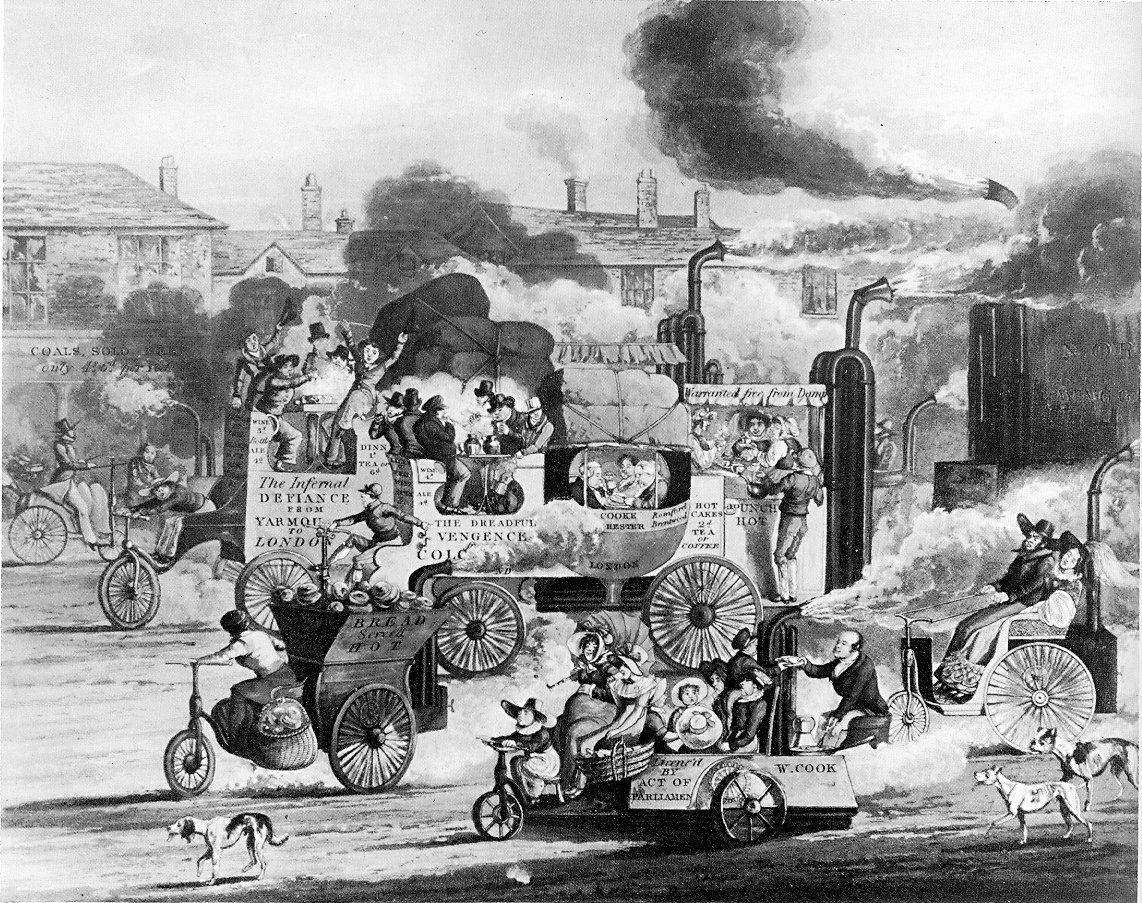
1831 satire on steam coaches

== See also ==
- Charles Dance (motorist)
- History of the automobile mainly covers later, internal combustion vehicles
- List of motorized trikes
- List of steam car makers
- Steam car
- Steam bus
- Steam engine
- Steam wagon
- The Steam House (Jules Verne novel)
- Timeline of motor vehicle brands
