= History of the motorcycle =

The history of the motorcycle begins in the second half of the 19th century. Motorcycles are descended from the "safety bicycle," a bicycle with front and rear wheels of the same size and a pedal crank mechanism to drive the rear wheel. Despite some early landmarks in its development, the motorcycle lacks a rigid pedigree that can be traced back to a single idea or machine. Instead, the idea seems to have occurred to numerous engineers and inventors around Europe at around the same time.

== Early steam-powered cycles ==
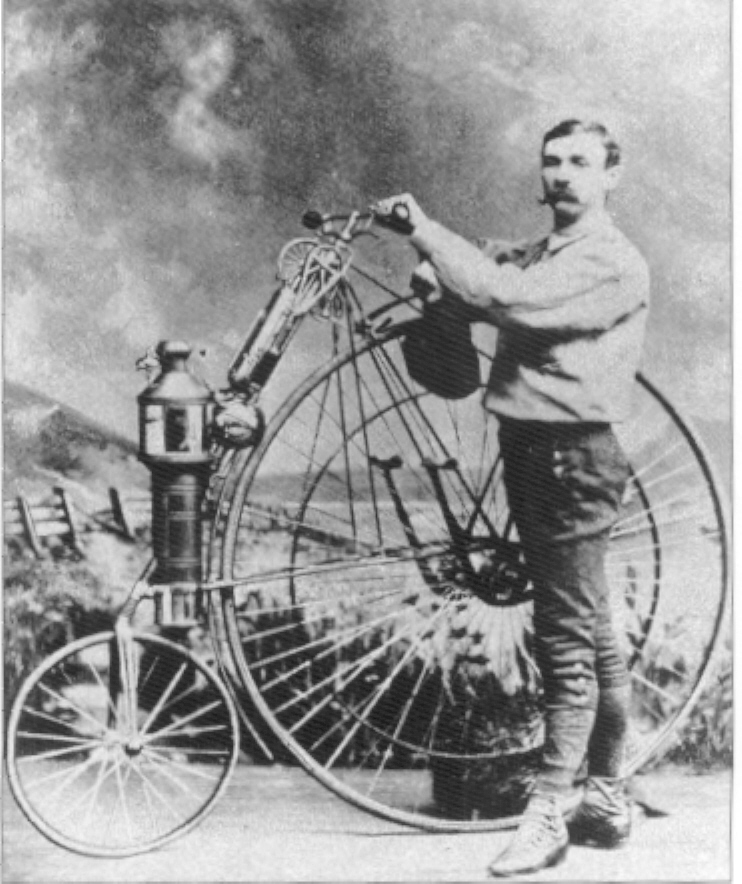
Lucius Copeland 1894

In the 1860s Pierre Michaux, a blacksmith in Paris, founded 'Michaux et Cie' ("Michaux and company"), the first company to construct bicycles with pedals called a velocipede at the time, or "Michauline". The first steam powered motorcycle, the Michaux-Perreaux steam velocipede, can be traced to 1867, when Pierre's son Ernest Michaux fitted a small steam engine to one of the 'velocipedes'.

The design went to the United States when Pierre Lallement, a Michaux employee who also claimed to have developed the prototype in 1863, filed for the first bicycle patent with the US patent office in 1866. In 1868 an American, Sylvester H. Roper of Roxbury, Massachusetts, developed a twin-cylinder steam velocipede, with a coal-fired boiler between the wheels. Roper's contribution to motorcycle development ended suddenly when he died demonstrating one of his machines in Cambridge, Massachusetts on June 1, 1896.

Also in 1868, a French engineer Louis-Guillaume Perreaux patented a similar steam powered single cylinder machine, the Michaux-Perreaux steam velocipede, with an alcohol burner and twin belt drives, which was possibly invented independently of Roper's. Although the patent is dated 1868, nothing indicates the invention had been operable before 1871.

A short story in the December 7, 1876 edition of the Brooklyn Times Union describes the invention of a Berlin, Germany machinist who built “a steam velocipede, the boiler of which is heated by means of a petroleum lamp, so that to the other dangers of fooling with that vehicle are not to be added those arising from combustion and explosion.”

In 1881, Lucius Copeland of Phoenix, Arizona designed a much smaller steam boiler which could drive the large rear wheel of an American Star high-wheeler at 12 mph. In 1887 Copeland formed the Northrop Manufacturing Co. to produce the first successful 'Moto-Cycle' (actually a three-wheeler).

== Experimentation and invention ==
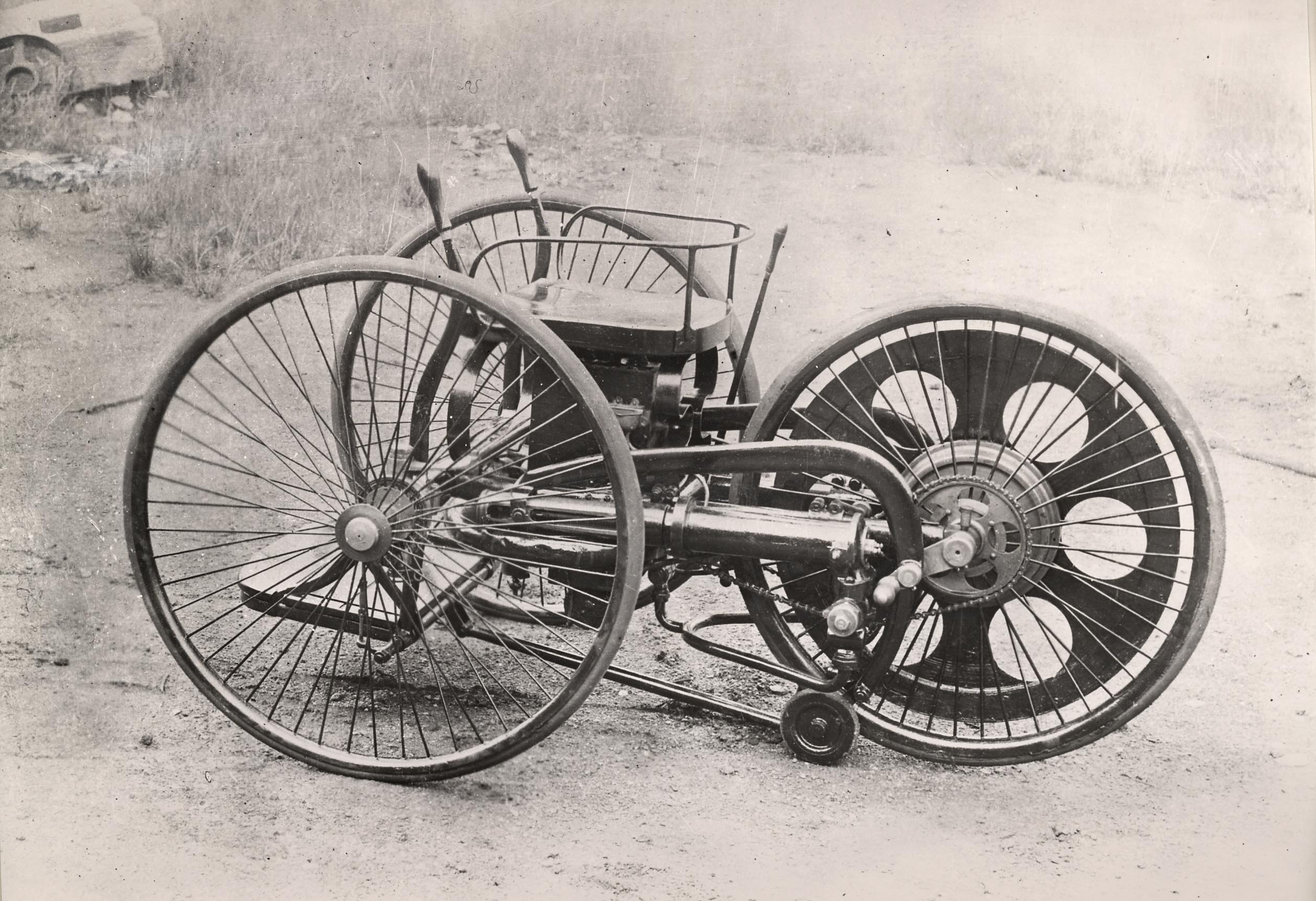
Butler's Patent Velocycle

The very first commercial design for a self-propelled bicycle was a three-wheel design called the Butler Petrol Cycle, conceived of and built by Edward Butler in England in 1884. He exhibited his plans for the vehicle at the Stanley Cycle Show in London in 1884, two years earlier than Karl Benz, who is generally recognized as the inventor of the modern automobile. Butler's vehicle was also the first design to be shown at the 1885 International Inventions Exhibition in London.

The vehicle was built by the Merryweather Fire Engine company in Greenwich, in 1888. the Butler Petrol Cycle (first recorded use of the term) It was a three-wheeled vehicle, with the rear wheel directly driven by a ^{5}/_{8}hp (466W) 600 cc (40 in^{3}; 2¼×5-inch {57×127-mm}) flat twin four stroke engine (with magneto ignition replaced by coil and battery), equipped with rotary valves and a float-fed carburettor (five years before Maybach), and Ackermann steering, all of which were state of the art at the time. Starting was by compressed air. The engine was liquid-cooled, with a radiator over the rear driving wheel. Speed was controlled by means of a throttle valve lever. No braking system was fitted; the vehicle was stopped by raising and lowering the rear driving wheel using a foot-operated lever; the weight of the machine was then borne by two small castor wheels. The driver was seated between the front wheels. It wasn't, however, a commercial success, as Butler failed to find sufficient financial backing.

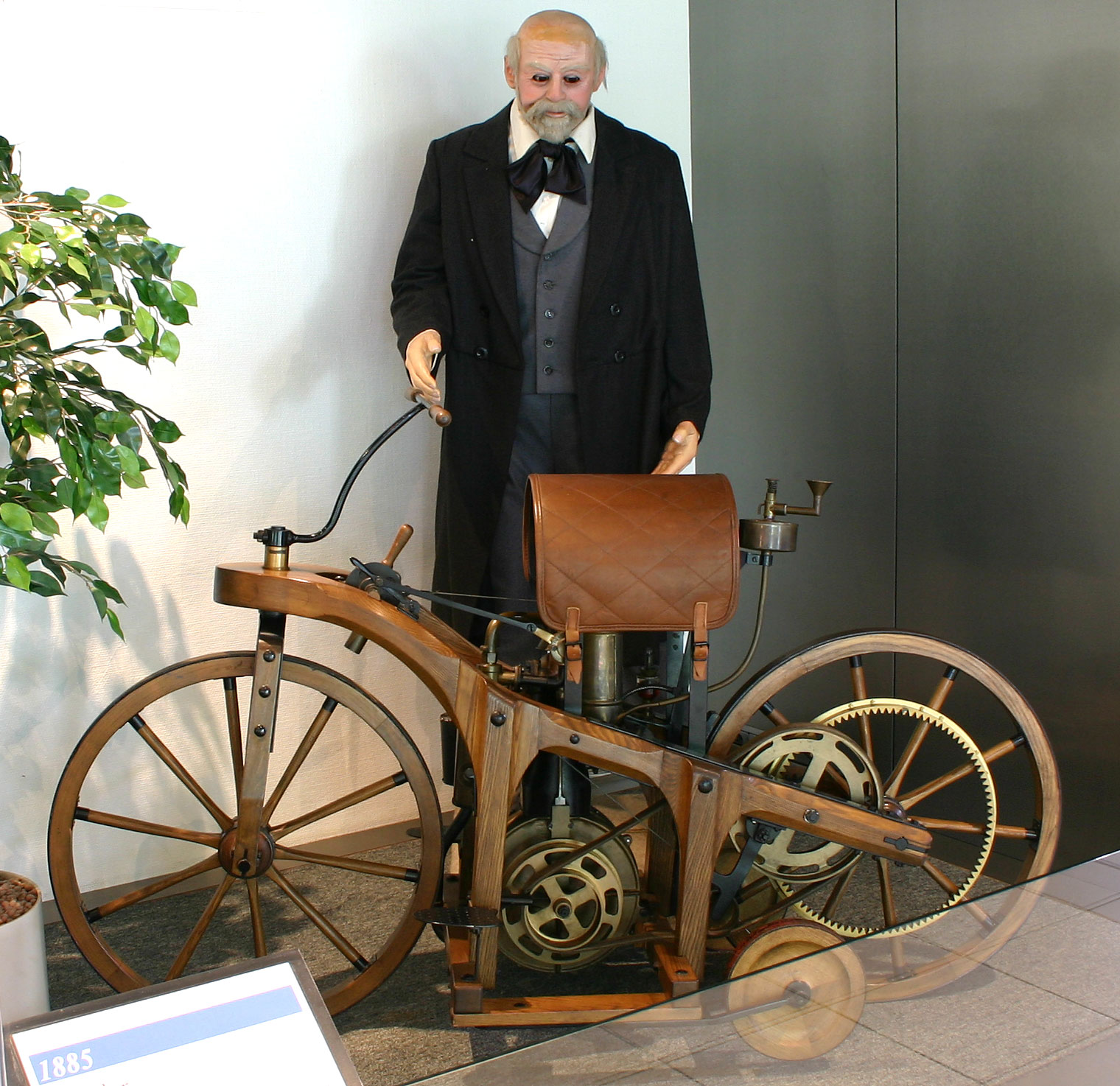
Replica of the 1885 Daimler-Maybach Reitwagen

The first internal combustion, petroleum fueled motorcycle was the Petroleum Reitwagen. It was designed and built by the German inventors Gottlieb Daimler and Wilhelm Maybach in Bad Cannstatt, Germany in 1885. It is widely recognized as the first motorcycle and Daimler is often called "the father of the motorcycle" for this invention. This vehicle was unlike either the safety bicycles or the boneshaker bicycles of the era in that it had zero degrees of steering axis angle and no fork offset, and thus did not use the principles of bicycle and motorcycle dynamics developed nearly 70 years earlier. Instead, it relied on two outrigger wheels to remain upright while turning. The inventors called their invention the Reitwagen ("riding car"). It was designed as an expedient testbed for their new engine, rather than a true prototype vehicle.

== First commercial products ==
In the decade from the late 1880s, dozens of designs and machines emerged, particularly in Germany and in England, and soon spread to America. During this early period of motorcycle history there were many manufacturers, since bicycle makers were adapting their designs for the new internal combustion engine.

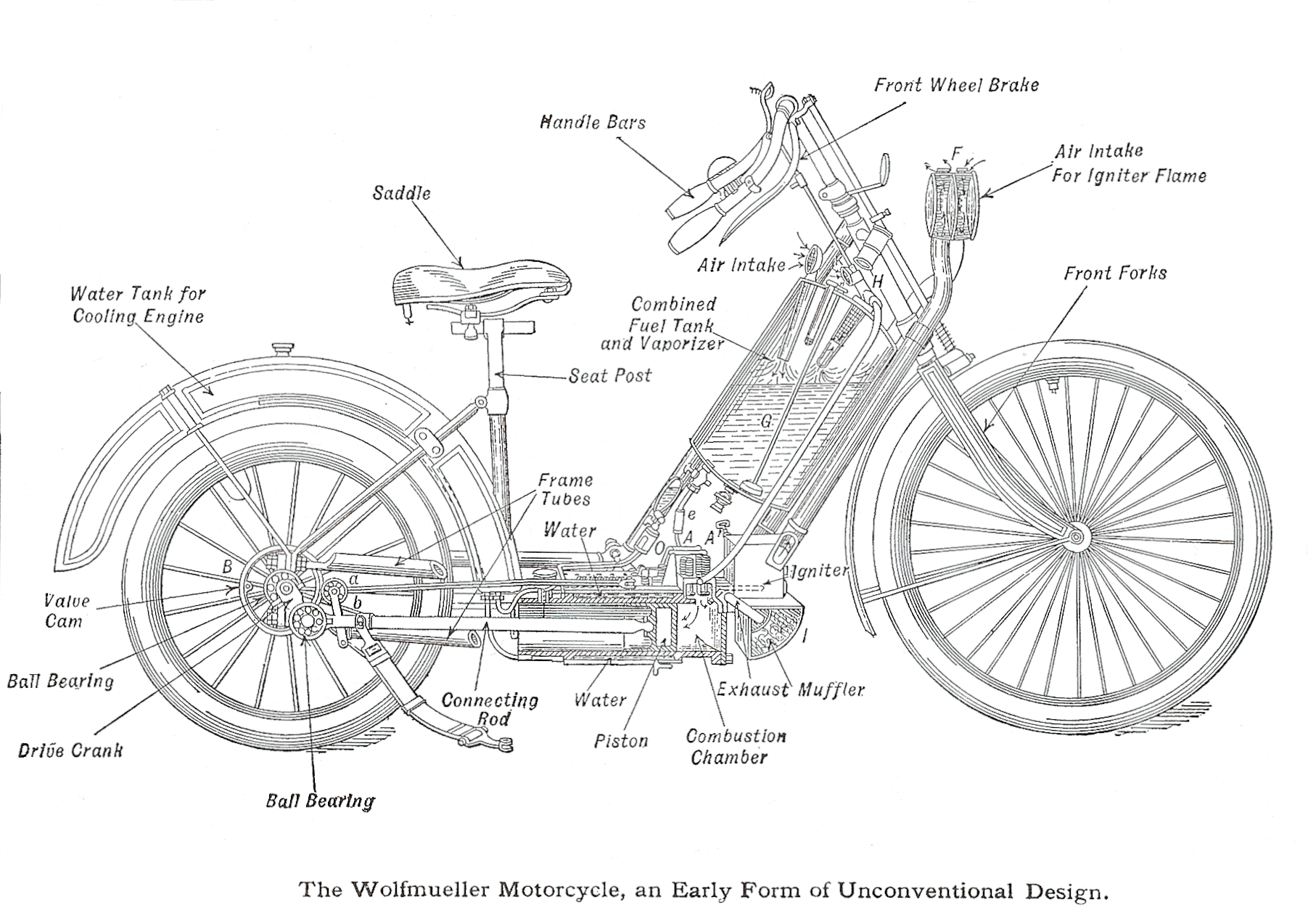
Diagram of 1894 Hildebrand & Wolfmüller.

In 1894 Hildebrand & Wolfmüller became the first series production motorcycle, and the first to be called a "motorcycle" (German: Motorrad). However, only a few hundred examples of this motorcycle were ever built. The first instance of the term "motor cycle" also appears in English the same year in materials promoting machines developed by E.J. Pennington, although Pennington's motorcycles never progressed past the prototype stage.

Excelsior Motor Company, originally a bicycle-manufacturing company based in Coventry in Warwickshire (England), began production of their first motorcycle model in 1896, available for purchase by the public. The first production motorcycle in the US was the Orient-Aster, built by Charles Metz in 1898 at his factory in Waltham, Massachusetts.

In 1898, Peugeot Motocycles presents at the Paris Motorshow the first motorcycle equipped with a Dion-Bouton motor. Peugeot Motocycles remains the oldest motorcycle manufacturer in the world.

In the early period of motorcycle history, many producers of bicycles adapted their designs to accommodate the new internal-combustion engine. As the engines became more powerful and designs outgrew the bicycle origins, the number of motorcycle producers increased. Many of the nineteenth-century inventors who worked on early motorcycles often moved on to other inventions. Daimler and Roper, for example, both went on to develop automobiles.

At the turn of the 20th century the first major mass-production firms emerged.

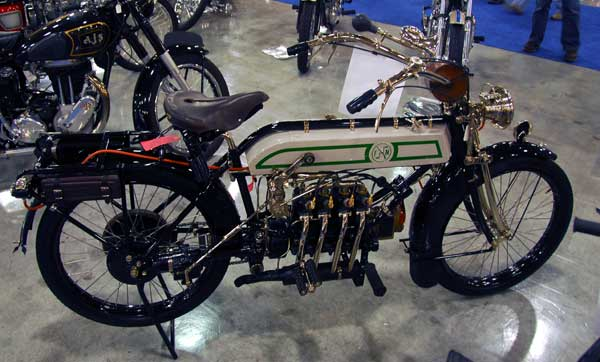
A 1913 FN (Fabrique National), Belgium, 4 cylinders and shaft drive

In 1901 English quadricycle- and bicycle-maker Royal Enfield introduced its first motorcycle, with a 239 cc engine mounted in the front and driving the rear wheel through a belt. In 1898 English bicycle-maker Triumph decided to extend its focus to include motorcycles, and by 1902 the company had produced its first motorcycle—a bicycle fitted with a Belgian-built engine. A year later it was the largest motorcycle-manufacturer, with an annual production of over 500 units. Other British firms included Norton and Birmingham Small Arms Company who began motorbike production in 1902 and 1910, respectively.

In 1901 the Indian Motocycle Manufacturing Company, which had been founded by two former bicycle-racers, designed the so-called "diamond framed" Indian Single, whose engine was built by the Aurora Firm in Illinois per Indian's specifications. The Single was made available in the deep blue. Indian's production was up to over 500 bikes by 1902, and would rise to 32,000, its best ever, in 1913. Indian produced over 20,000 bikes per year. The oldest surviving Russian-manufactured motorcycle, the Rossiya, dates from 1902. The American company Harley-Davidson started producing motorcycles in 1903.

During this period, experimentation and innovation were driven by the popular new sport of motorcycle racing. These enhancements quickly found their way to the public's machines.

Chief August Vollmer of the Berkeley, California Police Department is credited with organizing the first official police motorcycle-patrol in the United States in 1911. By 1914, motorcycles were no longer just bicycles with engines; they had their own technologies, although many still maintained bicycle elements, like the seats and suspension.

== The First World War ==
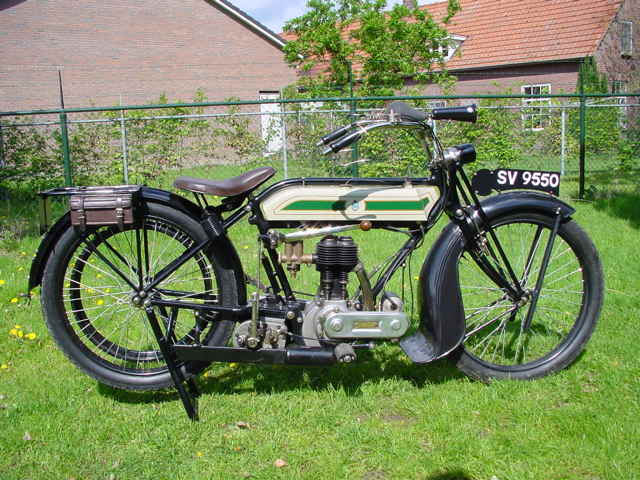
Triumph Motorcycles Model H, was mass-produced for the war effort and notable for its reliability.

During the First World War, motorbike production was greatly ramped up for the war effort to supply effective communications with front line troops. Messengers on horses were replaced with dispatch riders on motorcycles carrying messages, performing reconnaissance personnel and acting as a military police. American company Harley-Davidson was devoting over 50% of its factory output toward military contract by the end of the war. The British company Triumph Motorcycles sold more than 30,000 of its Triumph Type H model to allied forces during the war. With the rear wheel driven by a belt, the Model H was fitted with a 499 cc air-cooled four-stroke single-cylinder engine. It was also the first Triumph not to be fitted with pedals, so was a true motorcycle.

The Model H in particular, is regarded by many as having been the first "modern motorcycle". Introduced in 1915 it had a 550cc side-valve four-stroke engine with a three-speed gearbox and belt transmission. It was so popular with its users that it was nicknamed the "Trusty Triumph."

== After World War I ==
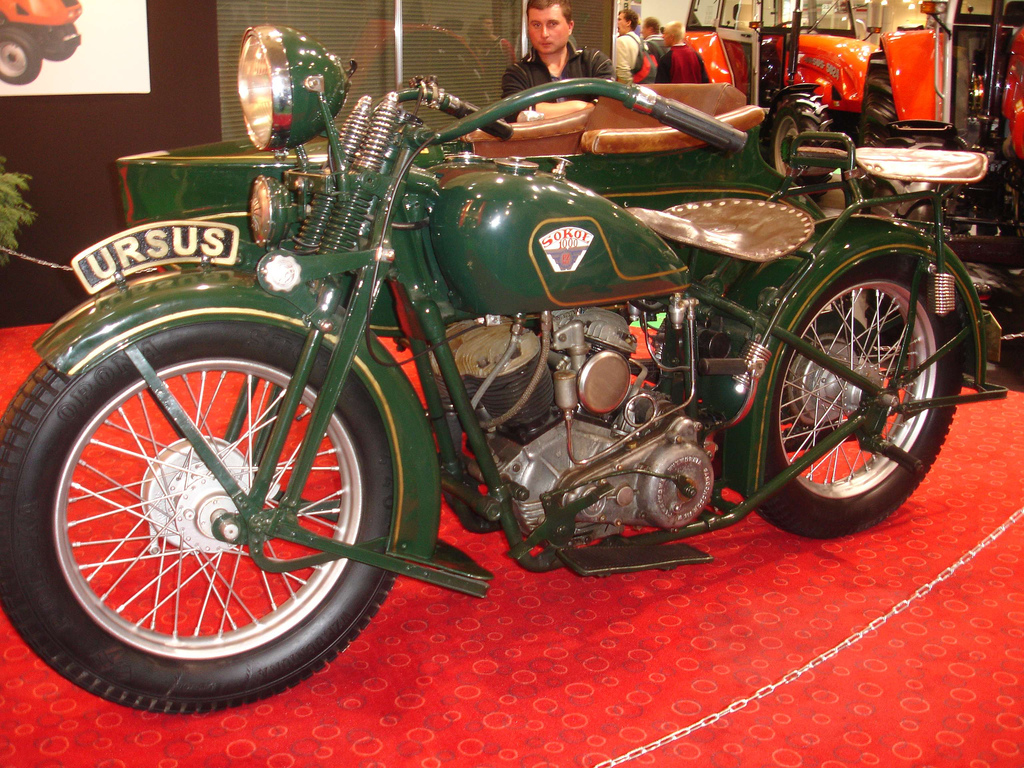
A pre-war Polish Sokół 1000

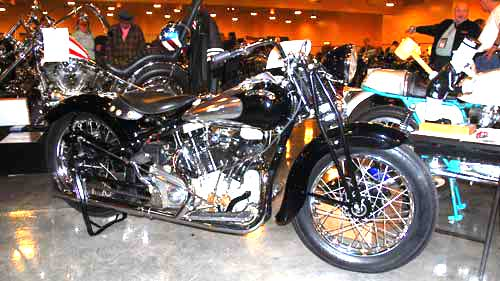
An historic V-twin American motorcycle — a 1941 Crocker

=== Interwar years ===
By 1920, Harley-Davidson became the largest manufacturer: dealers sold their motorcycles in 67 countries.

By the late 1920s or early 1930s, DKW in Germany took over as the largest manufacturer. BMW motorcycles came on the scene in 1923 with a shaft drive and an opposed-twin or "boxer" engine enclosed with the transmission in a single aluminum housing.

By 1931, Indian and Harley-Davidson were the only two American manufacturers producing commercial motorcycles. This two-company rivalry in the United States remained until 1953, when the Indian Motorcycle factory in Springfield, Massachusetts closed and Royal Enfield took over the Indian name.

There were over 80 different makes of motorcycle available in Britain in the 1930s, from the familiar marques like Norton, Triumph and AJS to the obscure, with names like New Gerrard, NUT, SOS, Chell and Whitwood, about twice as many motorcycle makes competing in the world market during the early 21st century.

In 1937, Joe Petrali set a new land speed record of 136.183 mph (219.165 km/h) on a modified Harley-Davidson 61 cubic inch (1,000 cc) overhead valve-driven motorcycle. The same day, Petrali also broke the speed record for 45 cubic inch (737 cc) engine motorcycles.

=== World War II ===
In Europe, production demands, driven by the buildup to World War II, included motorcycles for military use, and BSA supplied 126,000 BSA M20 motorcycles to the British armed forces, starting in 1937 and continuing until 1950. Royal Enfield also produced motorcycles for the military, including a 125 cc lightweight motorcycle that could be dropped (in a parachute-fitted tube cage) from an aircraft.

During World War II (1939 to 1945) the Wehrmacht used motorcycle troops (German: Kradschützentruppe (Krad.Schtz)) for mobility and surprise in Blitzkrieg operations extensively until about 1943, when conditions of mud, dust and snow on the Eastern Front and military developments reduced their roles to scouting and messaging.

=== After World War II ===
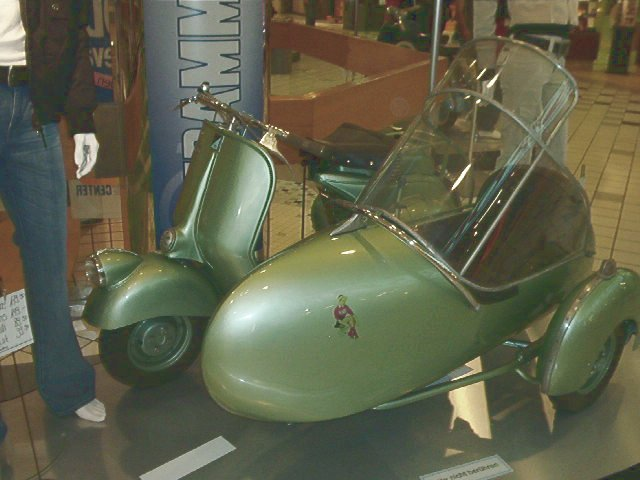
An original Vespa with sidecar

After the World War II, some American veterans found a replacement for the camaraderie, excitement, danger and speed of life at war in motorcycles. Grouped into loosely organized clubs, motorcycle riders in the US created a new social institution—the motorcyclists or "bikers"—which was later skewed by the "outlaw" persona Marlon Brando portrayed in the 1953 film The Wild One.

In Europe, on the other hand, post-war motorcycle producers were more concerned with designing practical, economical transportation than the social aspects, or "biker" image. Italian designer Piaggio introduced the Vespa in 1946, which experienced immediate and widespread popularity. Imports from the UK, Italy and Germany, thus found a niche in US markets that American bikes did not fill.

Honda became the largest motorcycle manufacturer in 1959. It established the across-the-frame-four engine configuration as a design with huge potential for power and performance. Shortly after the introduction of the SOHC, Kawasaki demonstrated the potential of the four-stroke four-cylinder engine with the introduction of the KZ900.

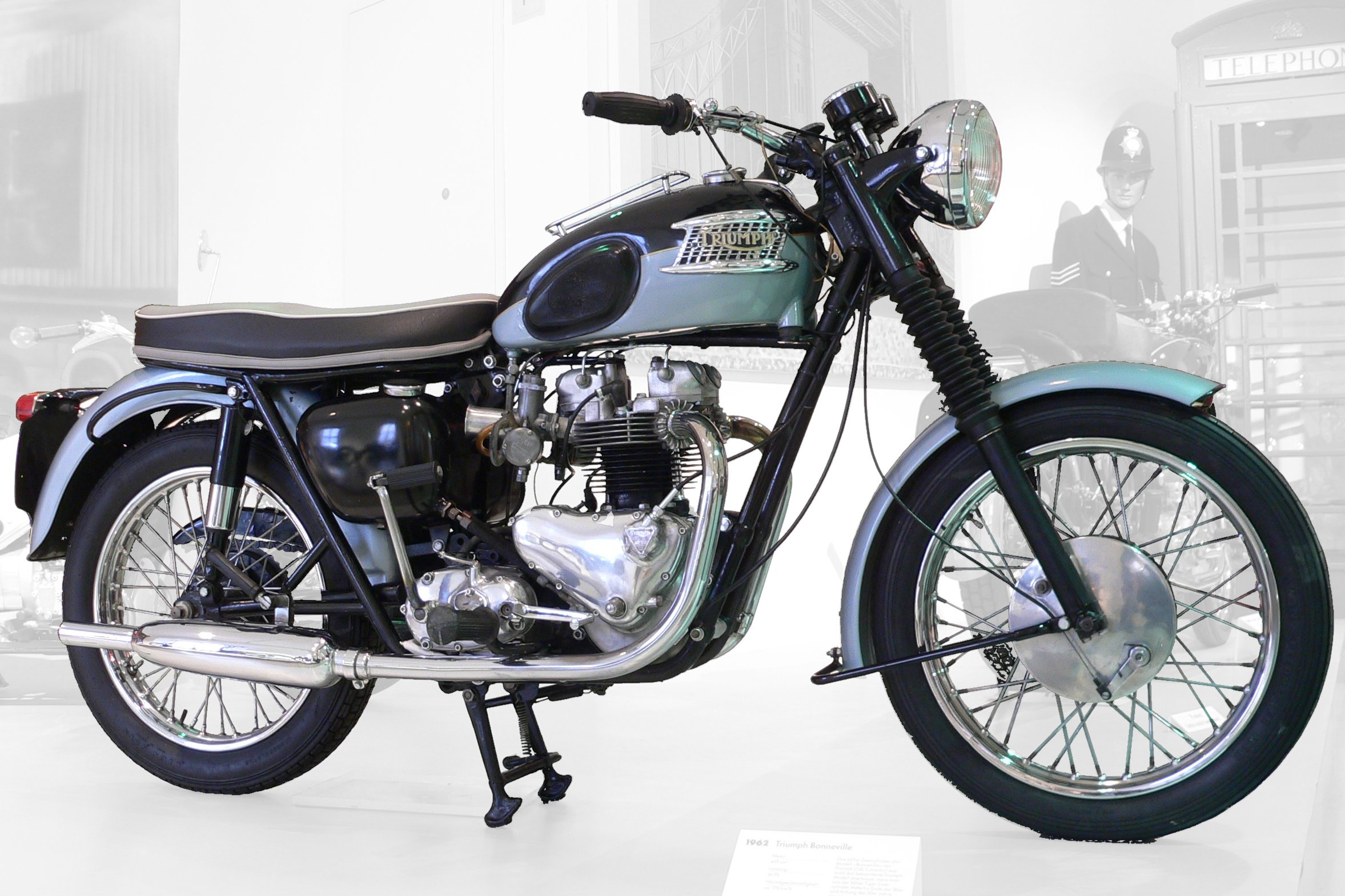
A 1962 Triumph Bonneville represents the popularity of British motorcycles at that time

British manufacturers Triumph, BSA, and Norton retained a dominant position in some markets until the rise of the Japanese manufacturers, led by Honda, in the late 1960s and early 1970s. The role of the motorcycle shifted in the 1960s, from the tool of a life to a toy of a lifestyle. It became part of an image, of status, a cultural icon for individualism, a prop in Hollywood B-movies.

The motorcycle also became a recreational machine for sport and leisure, a vehicle for carefree youth, not essential transportation for the mature family man or woman, and the Japanese were able to produce modern designs more quickly, more cheaply, and of better quality than their competitors. Their motorbikes were more stylish and more reliable, so the British manufacturers fell behind as mass-market producers.

Suzuki, Kawasaki and Yamaha each started producing motorcycles in the 1950s. Meanwhile, the sun was setting on British dominion over the big-displacement motorbike market.

=== Japanese dominance ===
The Honda CB750 revolutionized motorcycle marketing and was emblematic of Japanese dominance

The excellence of Japanese motorcycles caused similar effects in all Western markets: many Italian bike-firms either went bust or only just managed to survive. As a result, BMW's worldwide sales sagged in the 1960s, but came back strongly with the introduction of a completely redesigned "slash-5" series for model year 1970.

From the 1960s through the 1990s, small two-stroke motorcycles were popular worldwide, partly as a result of the pioneering work of the East German Daniel Zimmermann (rotary disc valve) and MZ's Walter Kaaden who developed the two-stroke expansion chamber in the 1950s. These ideas were taken up by Suzuki when Ernst Degner, the MZ engineer and rider, defected to the West on 13 September 1961 after retiring from the 125cc Swedish Grand Prix at Kristianstad. Degner, an excellent engineer, immediately joined Suzuki and his knowledge became their technology springboard.

Harley-Davidson in the US at the time suffered from the same problems as the European firms, but its unique product-range, American tariff-laws and nationalism-driven customer-loyalty allowed it to survive. One alleged flaw, however, was retaining the characteristic Harley-Davidson 45° engine vee-angle, which causes excess vibration as well as the loping Harley-Davidson sound.

BMW motorcycle introduced a factory full fairing in the R100RS of 1977 — the first factory fairing produced in quantity.

== The present ==
In November 2006, the Dutch company E.V.A. Products BV Holland announced that the first commercially available diesel-powered motorcycle, its Track T-800CDI, achieved production status.

The Track T-800CDI uses an 800 cc three-cylinder Daimler Chrysler diesel engine. However, other manufacturers, including Royal Enfield, had been producing diesel-powered bikes since at least 1965.

=== In the developing world ===
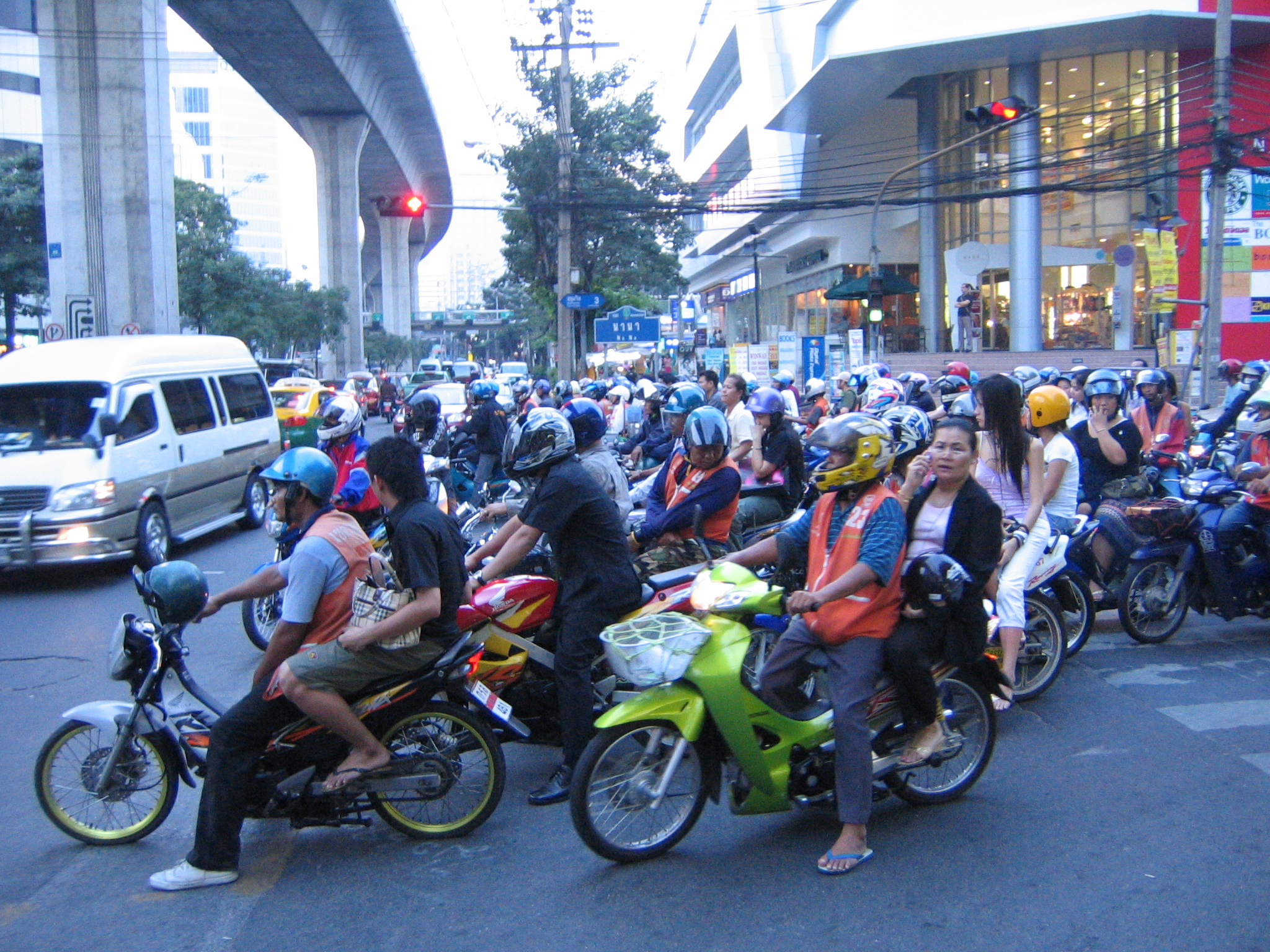
Motorcycle traffic in Bangkok

There is demand for smaller, cheaper motorcycles in the developing world, and firms meeting that demand now also compete in mature markets, such as China's Hongdou which makes a version of Honda's CG125.

Motorcycle taxis are commonplace in the developing world. Scooters, mopeds and motorcycles offer a fast way around snarled traffic and scarce mass transit, as they can squeeze through jams.

The first ethanol flex fuel motorcycle in the world was launched to the Brazilian market by Honda in March 2009, the CG 150 Titan Mix During the first eight months after its market launch the CG 150 Titan Mix had captured a 10.6% market share, and ranking second in sales of new motorcycles in the Brazilian market in 2009. In September 2009, Honda launched a second flexible-fuel motorcycle, and by December 2010 both Honda flexible-fuel motorcycles had reached cumulative production of 515,726 units, representing an 18.1% market share of the Brazilian new motorcycle sales in that year. As of January 2011 there were four flex-fuel motorcycle models available in the market, and production reached the one million milestone in June 2011.

== See also ==
- List of motorcycle manufacturers
- Motorcycle land-speed record
- List of fastest production motorcycles
- Electric motorcycles and scooters
- Outline of motorcycles and motorcycling
