= Copeland steam bicycle =

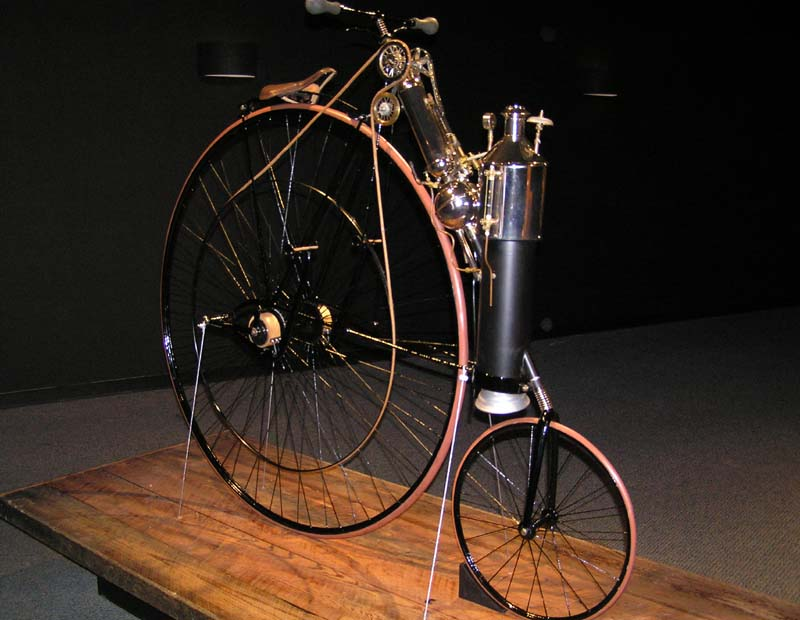
- A Copeland replica at the Art of the Motorcycle (Memphis) exhibition
- Manufacturer: Lucius Copeland
- Production: 1884
- Engine: Single steam cylinder
- Top speed: c. 15 mph (24 km/h)
- Power: 4 hp (3.0 kW) @ 2,600 RPM
- Transmission: Single speed, belt drive
- Frame type: American Star Bicycle steel frame

The Copeland steam bicycle was a steam powered, two-wheeled motor vehicle made by Lucius Copeland in 1881 and is sometimes classed as an early motorcycle.

In 1881 Copeland designed an efficient small steam boiler which could drive the large rear wheel of a Columbia penny-farthing to a speed of 12 miles per hour (19 km/h). Unlike typical penny-farthing bicycles, the Copeland had a small wheel at the front, which was turned by the handlebar for steering, and large wheel at the back.

In 1884 Copeland used an American Star bicycle, smaller steering wheel in front, to construct a new demonstration vehicle for the Maricopa County Fair that year. The "Star" was able to cover a mile in four minutes and to carry enough water to operate for an hour. Copeland set up the Northrop Manufacturing Co. in 1887 in Camden, New Jersey, to produce a three-wheeled version, the "Phaeton Moto-Cycle", which he demonstrated at the Smithsonian Institution in Washington D.C in 1888.

The steam-powered engine produced 4 horsepower at 2600 rpm with a 100-pound (45 kg) boiler around the steering column with the water heated by kerosene. A simple leather belt drove the large rear wheel, yielding a top speed of around 15 miles per hour (24 km/h).

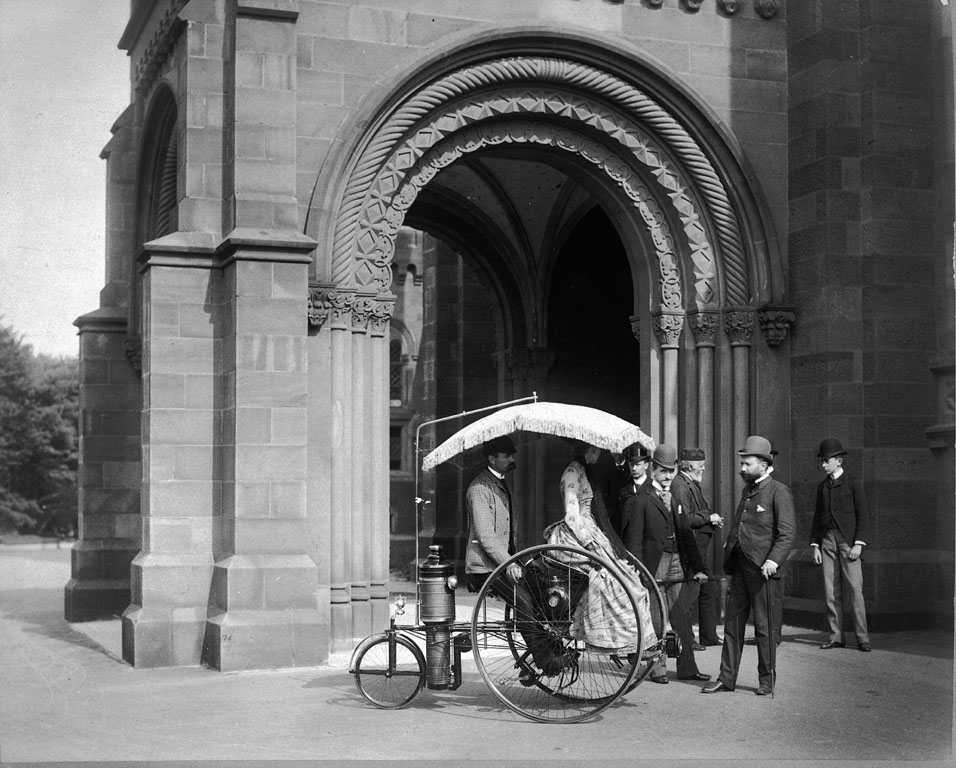
Copeland carrying Frances Benjamin Johnston on his Phaeton Moto-Cycle at the Smithsonian Institution Building in 1888. Behind are his partner Sandford Northrop, and Smithsonian officials E. H. Hawley, W. H. Travis and J. Elfreth Watkins.

== Surviving replicas ==
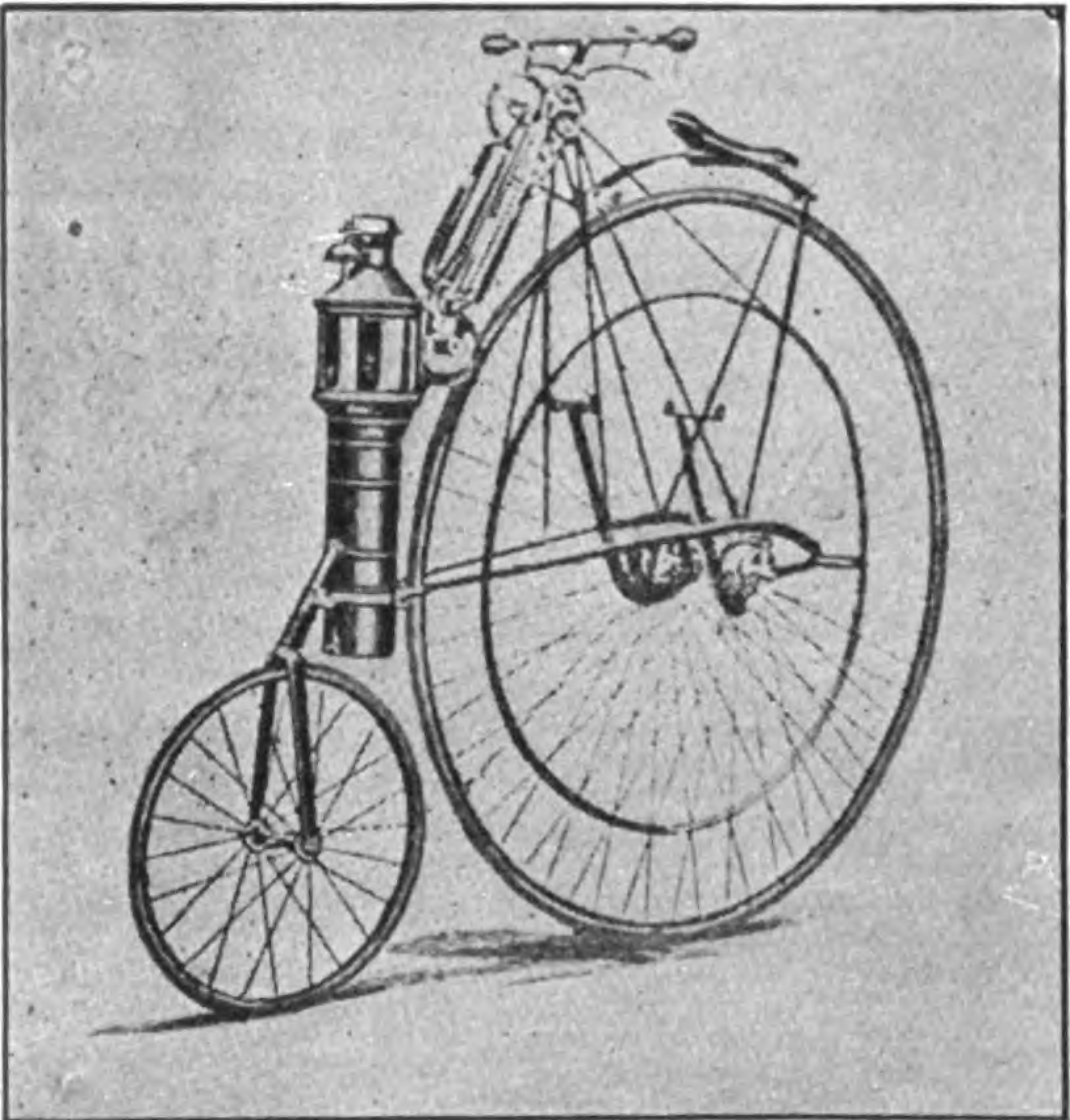
illustration from 1921

Peter Gagan, a former president of the Antique Motorcycle Club of America, was able to trace an 1884 "Star" bicycle with an original Copeland steam engine to the Phoenix Museum of History. Gagan took sufficiently detailed measurements to create a full-scale, working replica, which was hurriedly assembled to feature at the Guggenheim's 'The Art of the Motorcycle' Exhibition when it opened on The Las Vegas Strip in October 2001. This finished replica of the original Copeland "Star" is among the oldest motorcycle designs in operable condition in the world (the oldest are functional replicas of Sylvester H. Roper's 1869 steam velocipede). This has inspired the Phoenix Museum of History to build a second Copeland replica, though it is not intended to be a working model.
