= Lucius Copeland =

American engineer

Lucius Day Copeland
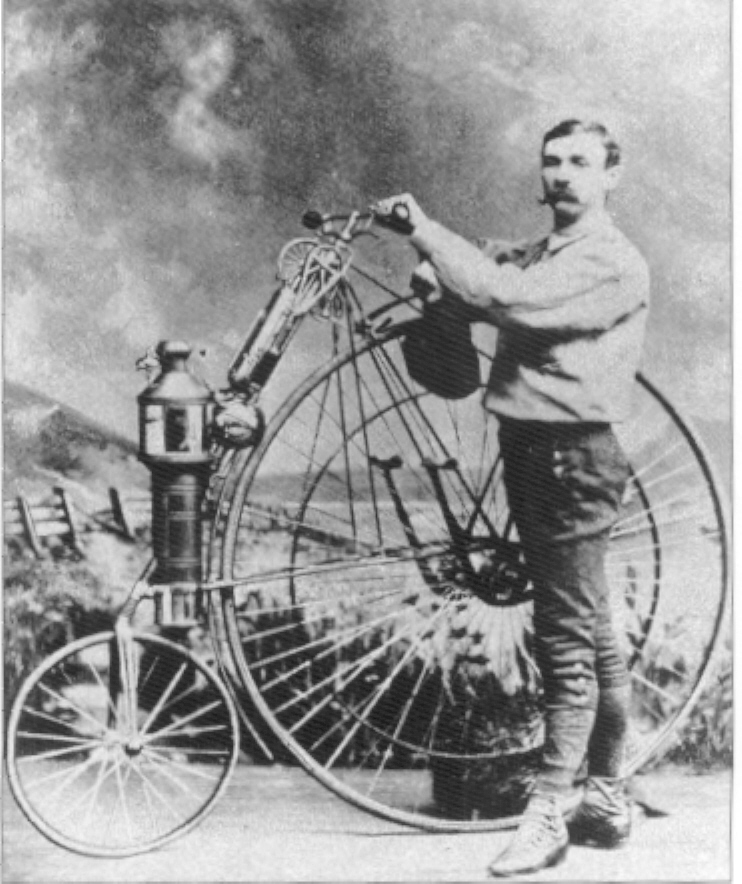
- Lucius Copeland and his steam bicycle, 1884
- Occupations: Engineer and inventor

Lucius Day Copeland was a pioneering 19th-century engineer and inventor from Phoenix, Arizona who demonstrated one of the first motorcycles, the Copeland steam bicycle, a steam-powered Star high-wheeler at the first Arizona Territorial Fair in 1884.

== Three-wheeler ==
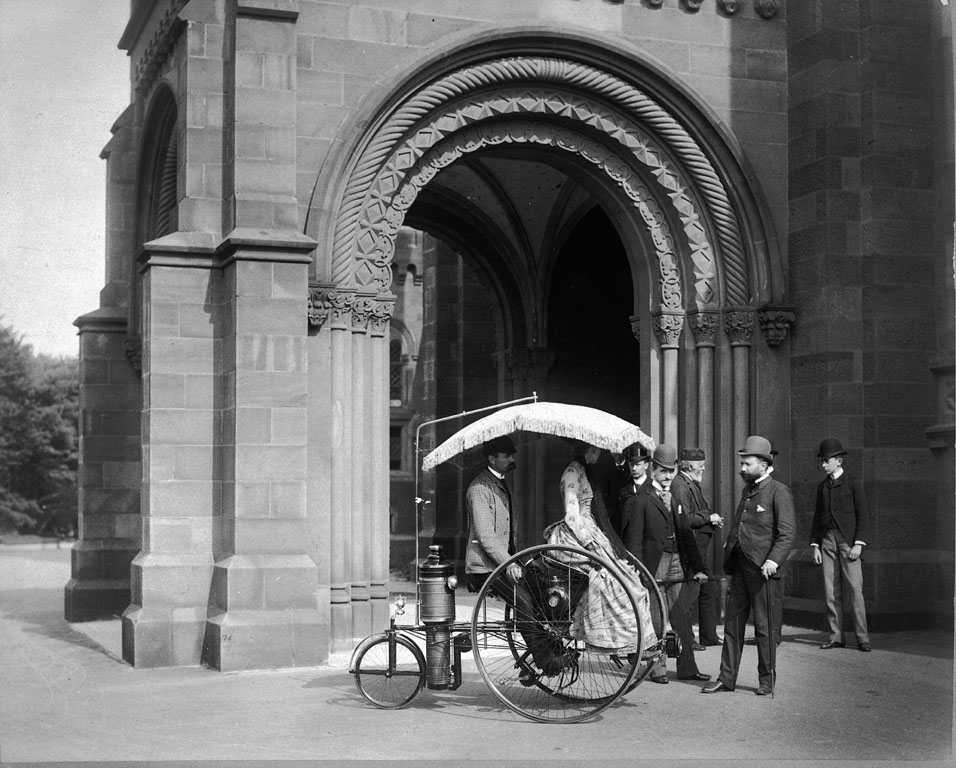
Copeland carrying Frances Benjamin Johnston on his Phaeton Moto-Cycle at the Smithsonian Institution Building in 1888. Behind are his partner Sandford Northrop, and Smithsonian officials E. H. Hawley, W. H. Travis and J. Elfreth Watkins.

Copeland also invented the first successfully mass-produced three-wheeled car. About 200 of his "Phaeton steamers" were produced before he retired in 1891. Copeland had produced the first successful steam tricycle, with a range of 30 miles (48 km) and taking only 5 minutes to build up enough steam to average 10 miles per hour (16 km/h). Accompanied by another director of Northrop Manufacturing, Copeland successfully completed a return trip to Atlantic City of 120 miles (190 km) in one of his three-wheeled "Phaeton steamers". About 200 were produced before Copeland decided that he wasn't making enough money and retired in 1891.
