= American Star Bicycle =

Early type of bicycle

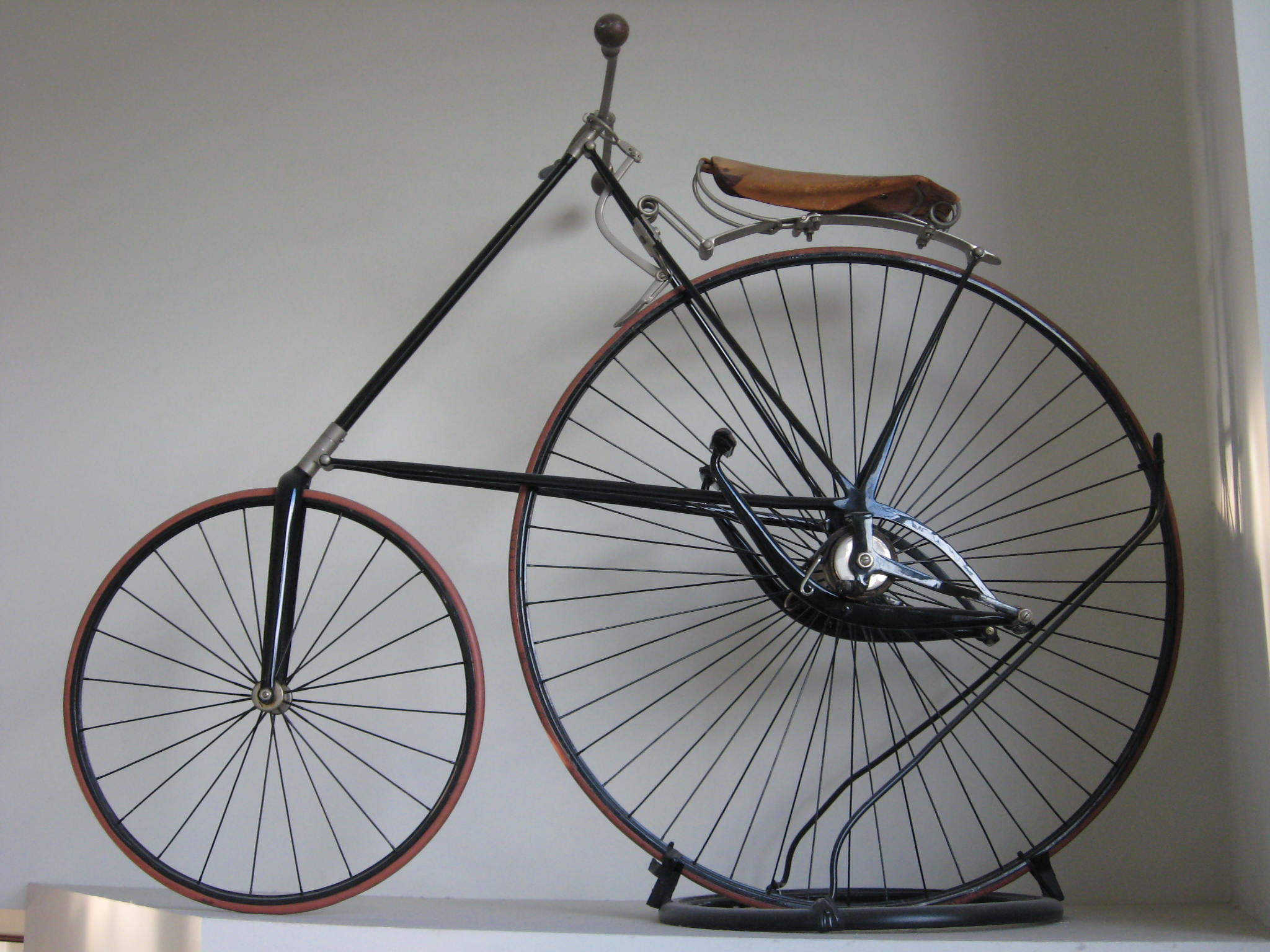
- Type: Bicycle
- Inventor: G. W. Pressey
- Inception: 1880
- Manufacturer: H. B. Smith Machine Company

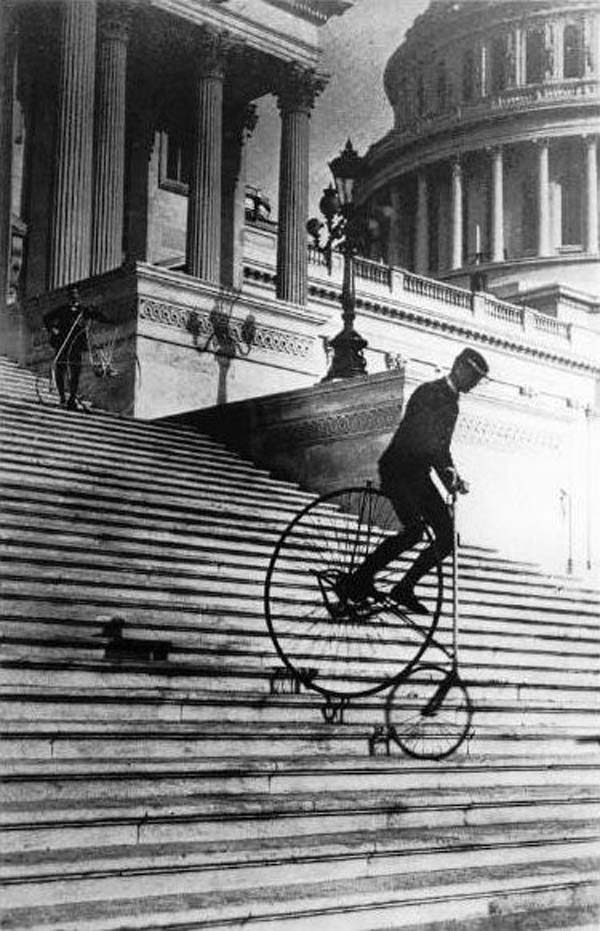
Will Robertson of the Washington Bicycle Club rides an American Star Bicycle down the steps of the United States Capitol in 1885.

The American Star Bicycle was invented in 1880 by G. W. Pressey and manufactured by the H. B. Smith Machine Company in Smithville, Burlington County, New Jersey. It was characterized by a small wheel in front to avoid the problem of tipping forward inherent in other high wheelers. A Star bicycle was photographed being ridden down the steps in front of the United States Capitol in 1885 to demonstrate its longitudinal stability, and Star bicycles were used for the sport of bicycle polo in the mid-1880s. Pressey sued Smith in 1887 for royalties. The name "Star" was attributed to the double star arrangement of the spokes.

== Details ==
The small front wheel, 18–23 inches (46–58 cm) in diameter, steered, and the large rear wheel, 42–60 inches (110–150 cm) in diameter, provided the forward driving force and bore most of the rider's weight. The light load on the front wheel was reported to have made it skittish on loose surfaces such as sand and gravel. American Stars incorporated pneumatic tires very soon after they were developed, and braking was provided by a spoon brake acting on the rear wheel and actuated by a lever on the right handlebar.

A pair of independent treadle mechanisms collected power from the rider's legs instead of a crank. Power from each treadle was transferred to the rear wheel by a leather strap over a ratchet mechanism. (See image in gallery below.) The attachment point of the leather strap could be moved to provide multiple gear ratios, and both treadles could be pressed simultaneously for a brief increase in torque. A spring attached to the ratchet rewound the strap when the foot was raised. This treadle arrangement also allowed riders of different sizes to ride the same bike comfortably without modification, as the pedals were not constrained to trace a circle about an axle.

An undated advertisement lists prices from $75 to $120, depending on wheel size and finish, which varied from "plainly finished machine; painted and striped" to "all nickled [sic] and polished, except the rim, which is painted and striped in gold."

== Variations ==
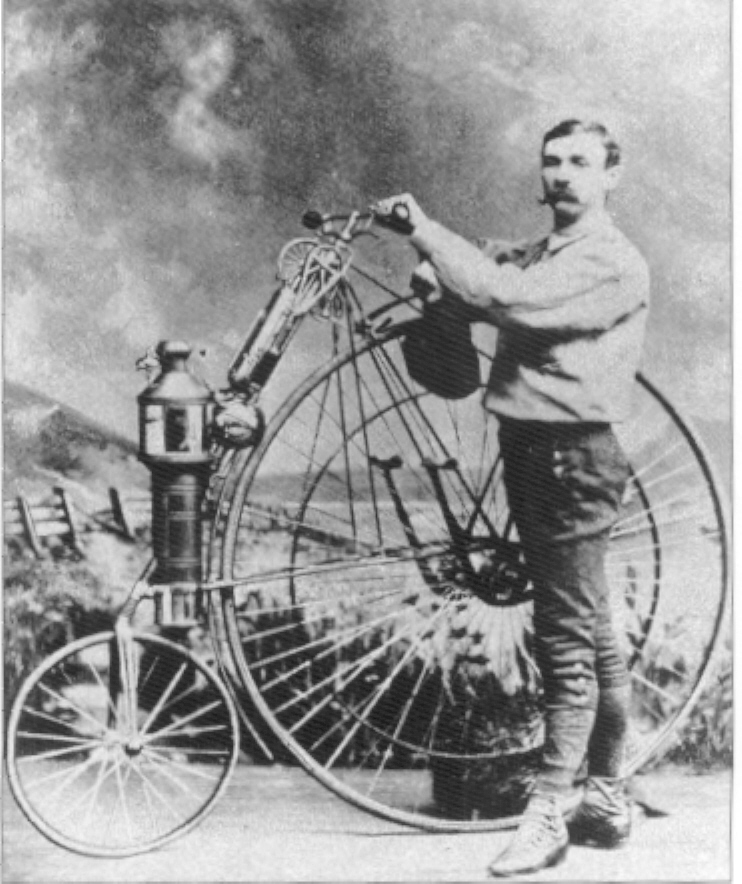
Copeland steam bicycle, a steam-powered Star, 1884

Smith also offered tricycles in 1887 and 1888 and patented a steam tricycle in 1889.

At the first Maricopa County Fair in 1884, Lucius Copeland demonstrated his steam bicycle, one of the first motorcycles, a steam-powered Star high-wheeler. It was claimed to have traveled 1 mile (1.6 km) in 4 minutes, at a steam pressure of 80 pounds per square inch (5.5 bar), and carried enough water and fuel to run for an hour.

"American Star" was also a brand name used by a Japanese bicycle manufacturer in the 1960s and 1970s.

== Songs ==
The Smith Machine Co. commissioned several musical compositions to promote the American Star Bicycle. In 1882, Chas. W. Nathan composed the Star Bicycle Gallop for piano, and in 1883, John Ford composed The Star Rider. Song & Chorus for piano and voice, which was provided on the back cover of advertisements for American Star Bicycles.

== Gallery ==
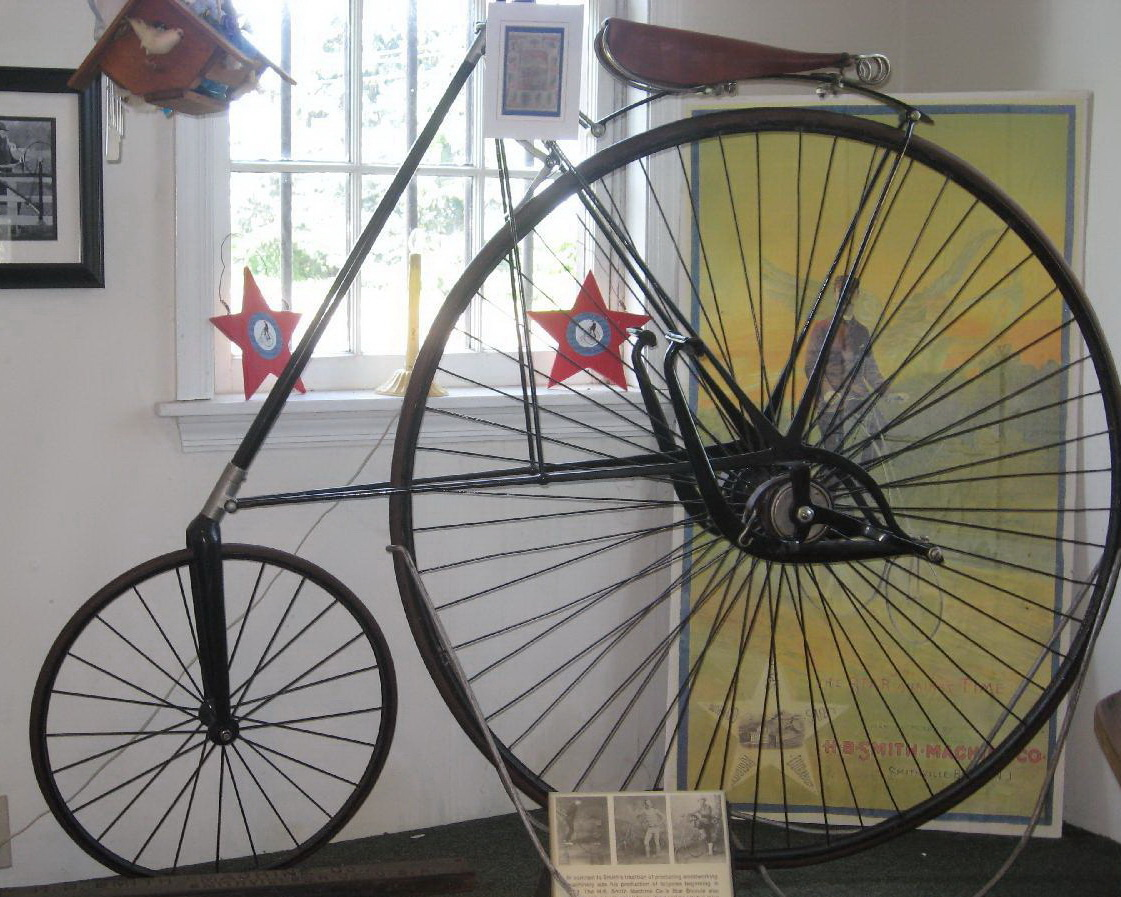
American Star Bicycle

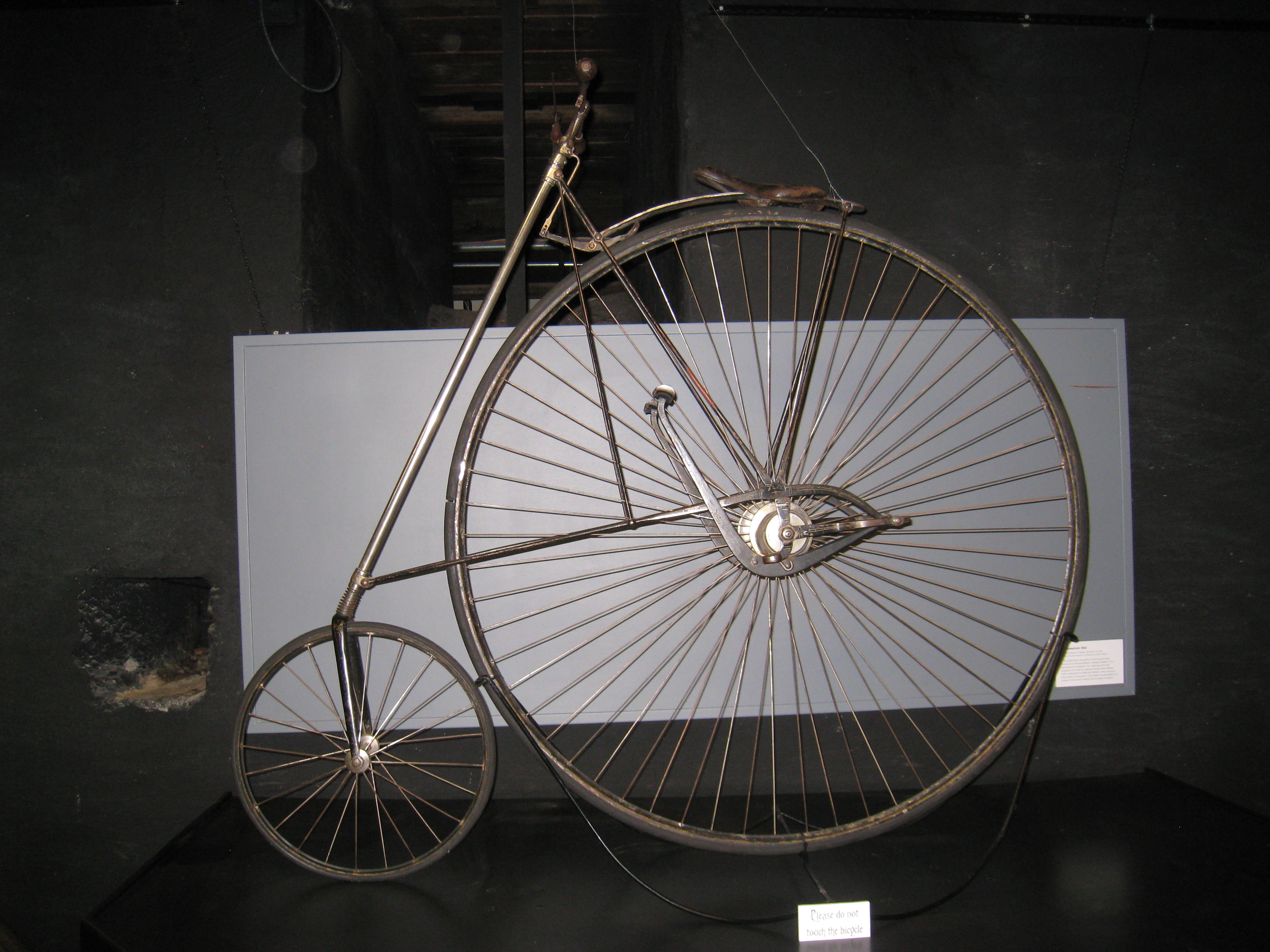
1885 51-inch American Star

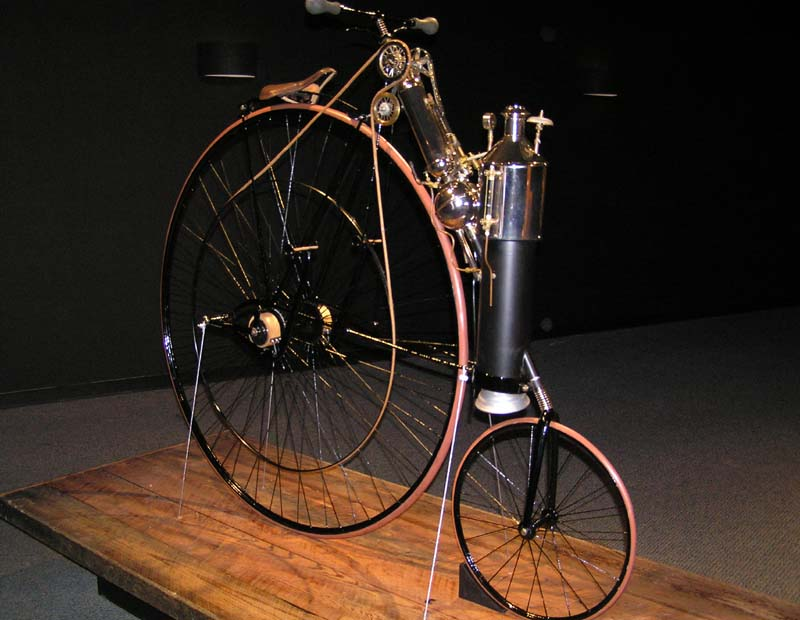
1884 Copeland Steam Cycle (replica) The Art of the Motorcycle – Memphis, USA

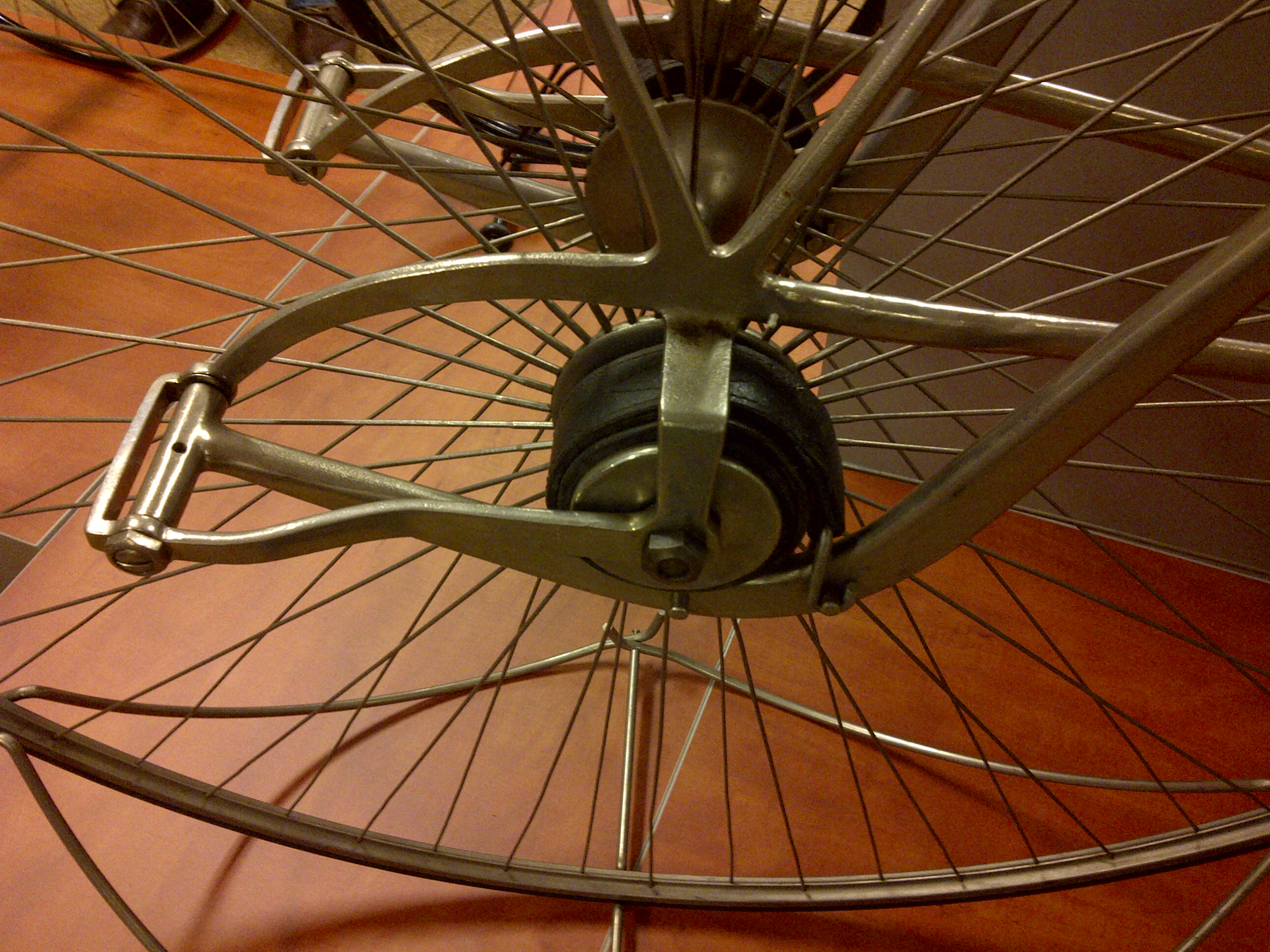
1884 American Star Bicycle drivetrain showing leather straps wrapped around independent ratchet mechanisms and attached to one of two pegs on lever arms – Batavus museum, Heerenveen, The Netherlands

== See also ==
- List of bicycle types
- History of the bicycle
