= J. Elfreth Watkins =

John Elfreth Watkins (1852–1903) was Curator of Mechanical Technology at the United States National Museum.

== Biography ==
John Elfreth Watkins received his education at Lafayette College, graduating in 1871, and worked first for the Delaware and Hudson Canal Company, as a mining engineer, for a year, and then for the Pennsylvania Railroad as assistant engineer of construction. Disabled in 1873 by an accident that resulted in the loss of his right leg, he was reassigned to the Amboy division of the railroad. In 1883 he became chief clerk of the Camden and Atlantic Railroad and in 1884 chief clerk of the Amboy division of the Pennsylvania Railroad.

In that same year, he became Honorary Curator of Transportation at the National Museum, taking the job full-time after two years. He left to organize the Pennsylvania Railroad's exhibits at the 1893 World's Columbian Exposition; stayed in Chicago for a year organizing the Department of Industrial Arts at the Field Columbian Museum; and then returned to the Smithsonian, where he was curator of Mechanical Technology until his death in 1903.

He played a key role in the preservation of the John Bull steam locomotive and its subsequent public displays by the Smithsonian Institution.

== Personal life ==
=== Family ===
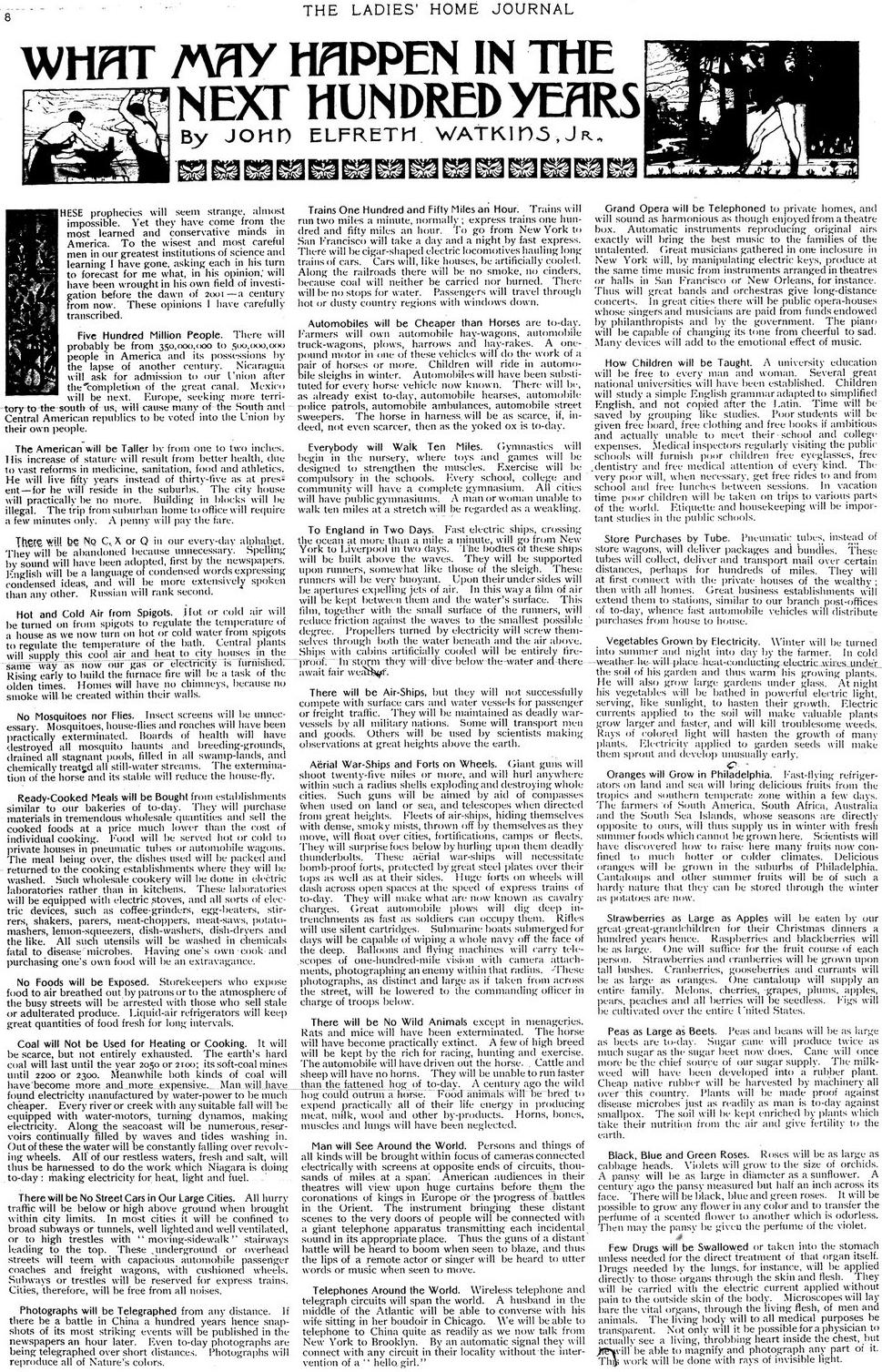
John Elfreth Watkins' Ladies Home Journal Predictions 1900

In 1900, his son, John Elfreth Watkins, Jr. contributed an article to the Ladies' Home Journal, entitled What May Happen in the Next Hundred Years. The predictions were remarkably accurate for 1900.

Prediction	Reality
"Photographs will be telegraphed from any distance. If there be a battle in China a hundred years hence, snapshots of its most striking events will be published in the newspapers an hour later... photographs will reproduce all of nature's colours."	Currently we have the Internet and color printers
"Americans will be taller by from one to two inches."	According to an article by the BBC, Watkins had unerring accuracy, the average American man in 1900 was about 66–67 inches (1.68–1.70m) tall and by 2000, the average was 69 inches (1.75m)
"Ready-cooked meals will be bought from establishment similar to our bakeries of today."	Ready cooked meals are a fixture in most supermarkets of today
"There will probably be from 350,000,000 to 500,000,000 people in America [implying the US plus Panama and Mexico]."	As of 2011 the US Census Bureau indicates that there are 311,000,000 Americans.
"Vegetables will be bathed in powerful electric light, serving, like sunlight, to hasten their growth. Electric currents applied to the soil will make valuable plants to grow larger and faster, and will kill troublesome weeds. Rays of coloured light will hasten the growth of many plants. Electricity applied to garden seeds will make them sprout and develop unusually early."	Electricity is commonly used now in greenhouses.
"Man will see around the world. Persons and things of all kinds will be brought within focus of cameras connected electrically with screens at opposite ends of circuits, thousands of miles at a span."	Internet and satellite television
"Huge forts on wheels will dash across open spaces at the speed of express trains of today."	Tanks
"Strawberries as large as apples will be eaten by our great-great-grandchildren."	Some fruits have been made larger. This prediction might become a reality through genetic engineering.
"Trains will run two miles a minute normally. Express trains one hundred and fifty miles per hour."	Current trains in the US run at this speed such as Acela
"Physicians will be able to see and diagnose internal organs of a moving, living body by rays of invisible light."	X rays, Ultrasonography, CAT Scan technologies
"There will be no C, X or Q in our everyday alphabet. English spelling will reflect pronunciation."	This prediction was incorrect as the alphabet has remained unchanged.
"All hurry traffic will be below or above ground when brought within city limits."	In most cities of the world cars are the most widespread form of transportation. But he correctly predicted elevated and underground roads.
"Mosquitoes, house-flies and roaches will have been exterminated."	Inaccurate prediction since mosquitoes and other insects are more than ever a widespread problem.

Watkins Jr. also published the earliest known account of Wan Hu in Scientific American, named" Wang Tu" in this version, purported to be the first astronaut. He is now thought, should the tale be true, to have lived during the Yuan or Ming dynasties.

"Tradition asserts that the first to sacrifice himself to the problem of flying was Wang Tu, a Chinese mandarin of about 2,000 years B.C. Who, having had constructed a pair of large, parallel and horizontal kites, seated himself in a chair fixed between them while forty-seven attendants each with a candle ignited forty-seven rockets placed beneath the apparatus. But the rocket under the chair exploded, burning the mandarin and so angered the Emperor that he ordered a severe paddling for Wang."
