= Wilhelm Maybach =

German engine designer and industrialist (1846–1929)

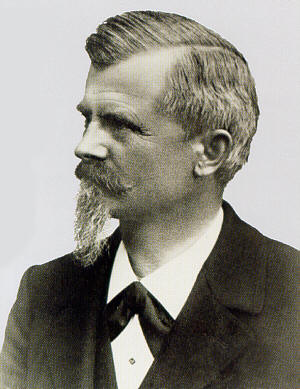
- Maybach in 1900
- Born: 9 February 1846; Heilbronn, Württemberg, German Confederation
- Died: 29 December 1929 (aged 83); Stuttgart, Württemberg, Germany
- Occupations: Engineer and industrialist
- Known for: Daimler Motoren Gesellschaft, Maybach-Motorenbau GmbH

Wilhelm Maybach (German: [ˈvɪlhɛlm ˈmaɪbax]; 9 February 1846 – 29 December 1929) was an early German engine designer and industrialist. During the 1890s he was hailed in France, then the world centre for car production, as the "King of Designers".

From the late 19th century Wilhelm Maybach, together with Gottlieb Daimler, developed light, high-speed internal combustion engines suitable for land, water, and air use. These were fitted to the world's first motorcycle, motorboat, and after Daimler's death, a new automobile introduced in late 1902, the Mercedes model, built to the specifications of Emil Jellinek.

Maybach rose to become technical director of the Daimler Motoren Gesellschaft (DMG) but did not get along with its chairmen. As a result, Maybach left DMG in 1907 to found Maybach-Motorenbau GmbH together with his son Karl in 1909; they manufactured Zeppelin engines. After the signing of the Versailles Treaty in 1919 the company started producing large luxury vehicles, branded as "Maybach". He died in 1929 and was succeeded by his son Karl Maybach. From around 1936 Maybach-Motorenbau designed and made almost all the engines fitted in German tanks and half-tracks used during World War 2, including those for the Panther, Tiger I and Tiger II heavy tanks.

Continuing after the war, Maybach Motorenbau remained a subsidiary of Luftschiffbau Zeppelin, making diesel engines. During the 1960s Maybach came under the control of Daimler-Benz and was renamed MTU Friedrichshafen.

In 2002 the Maybach brand name was revived for a luxury make but it was not successful. On 25 November 2011 Daimler-Benz announced they would cease producing automobiles under the Maybach brand name in 2013. In 2014, Daimler announced production of an ultra-luxury edition of the Mercedes-Benz S-Class under the new Mercedes-Maybach brand.

== Early life and career beginnings (1846 to 1869) ==
Wilhelm Maybach was born on 9 February 1846 in Heilbronn, Kingdom of Württemberg, the son of a carpenter and his wife Luise. He had four brothers. When he was eight years old the family moved from Löwenstein near Heilbronn to Stuttgart. His mother died in 1854 and his father in 1856.

After his relatives published an announcement in the Stuttgarter Anzeiger newspaper, a philanthropic institution at Reutlingen took in Maybach as a student. Its founder and director, Gustav Werner, discovered Maybach's technical inclination and helped to stimulate his career by sending him to the school's engineering workshop. At 15 years old (1861), Maybach was heading for a career in Industrial design and took extra classes in physics and mathematics at Reutlingen's public high school.

By the time he was 19 years old, he was a qualified designer working on stationary engines. His workshop manager, Gottlieb Daimler, then 29, noticed his efforts and took him on as his main assistant, a post he held until Daimler's death in 1900.

== Daimler and Otto's four-stroke engine (1869 to 1880) ==
In 1869, Maybach followed Daimler to Maschinenbau-Gesellschaft Karlsruhe AG in Karlsruhe, a manufacturer of heavy locomotives. Daimler was on the Executive Committee and they spent long nights discussing new designs for engines, pumps, lumber machinery, and metalworking.

In 1872, Daimler moved to Deutz-AG-Gasmotorenfabrik in Cologne, then the world's largest manufacturer of stationary gas engines. Nicolaus Otto, part owner of the company, focused on engine development with Daimler. Maybach joined them as Chief Designer.

In 1876, Nicolaus Otto patented the Otto cycle engine. It was a four-stroke cycle gas internal combustion engine with intake, compression, power, and exhaust strokes. One of Otto's more than 25 patents on this engine was later challenged and overturned, allowing Daimler and Maybach to produce their high-speed engine.

Also in 1876, Maybach was sent to show Deutz's engines at the Philadelphia World's Fair (USA). On returning to Cologne in 1877, he concentrated on improving the four-stroke design to prepare it for its impending commercial launch.

In 1878, Maybach married Bertha Wilhelmine Habermaas, a friend of Daimler's wife, Emma Kunz. Her family members were landowners who ran the post office in Maulbronn. On 6 July 1879 Karl Maybach was born, the first of their three children.

In 1880, Daimler and Otto had serious disagreements, resulting in Daimler's leaving Deutz-AG. Daimler received 112,000 goldmarks in Deutz-AG shares as compensation for patents granted to him and Maybach. Maybach also left shortly afterwards, and followed his friend to found a new company in Cannstatt.

== Daimler Motors: fast and small engines (1882) ==
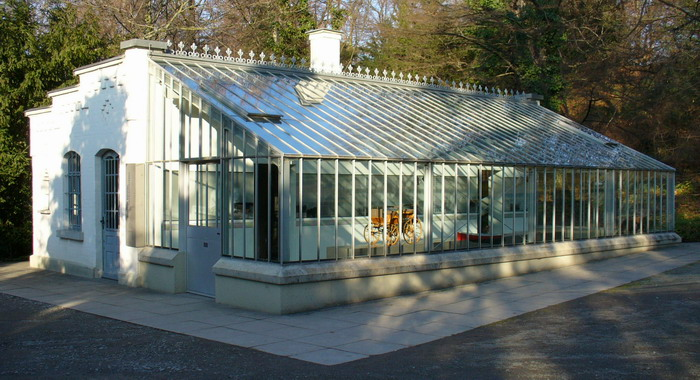
Daimler's summer house (Cannstatt)

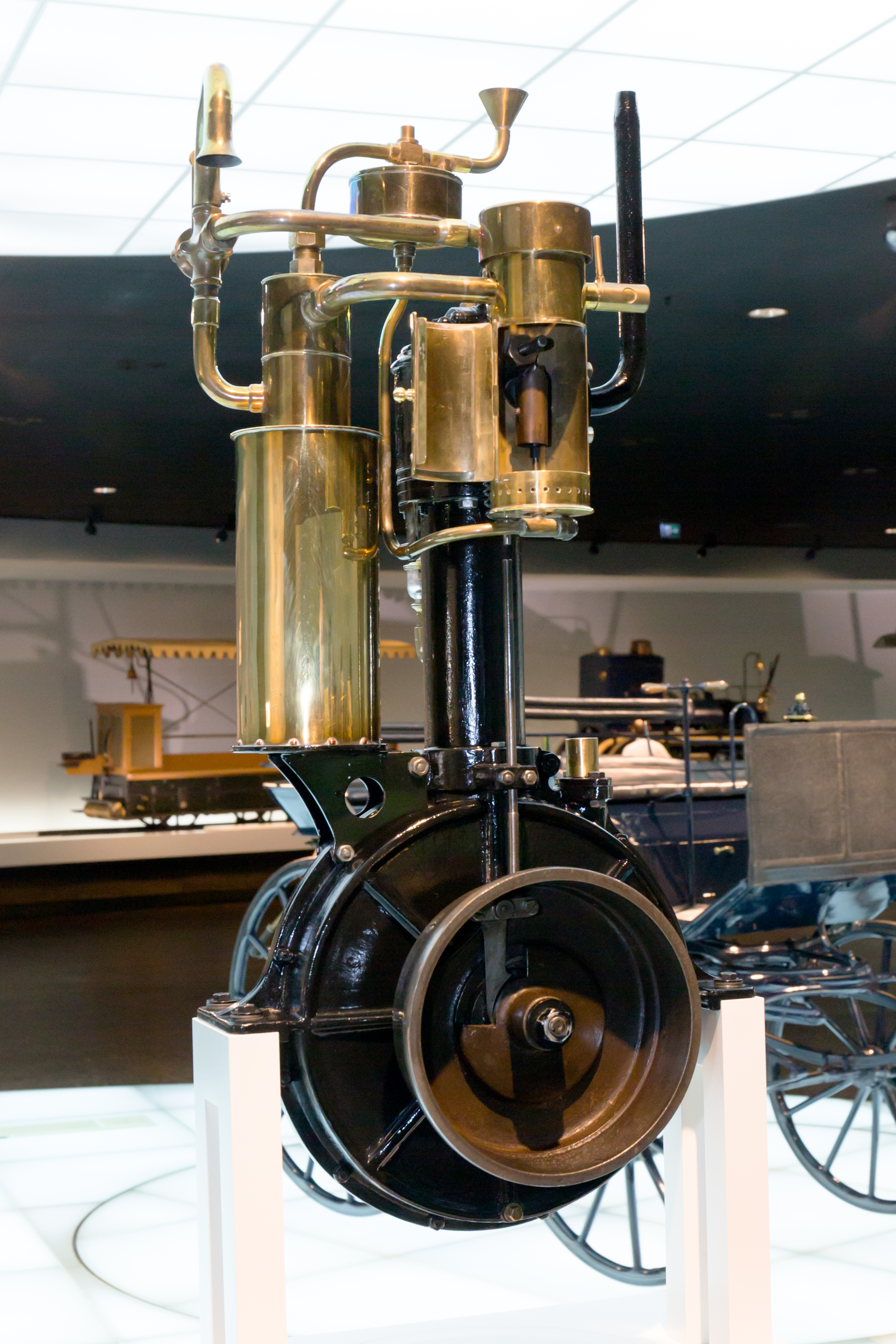
The 1885 Grandfather Clock Engine

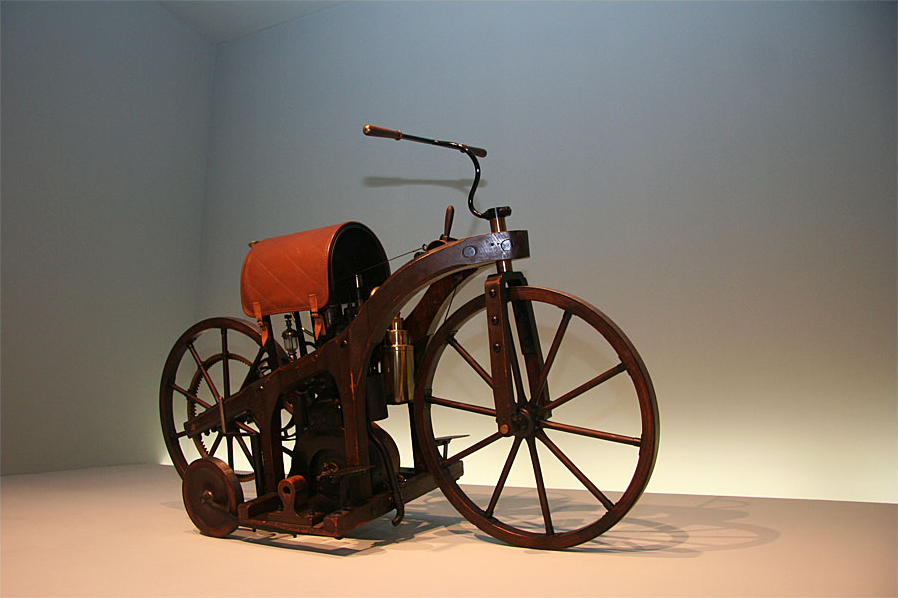
Replica of the Reitwagen

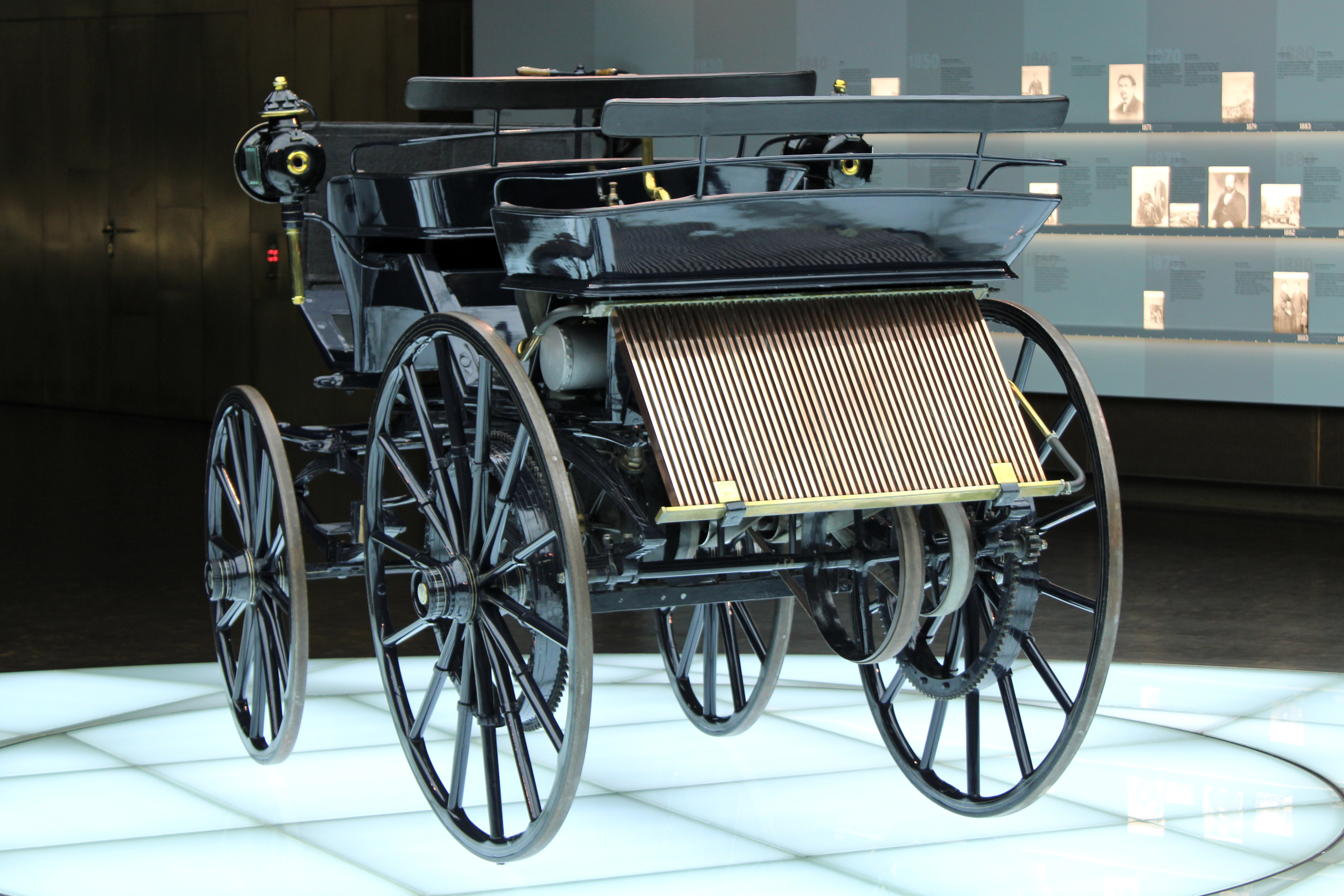
Daimler Motorcoach 1886

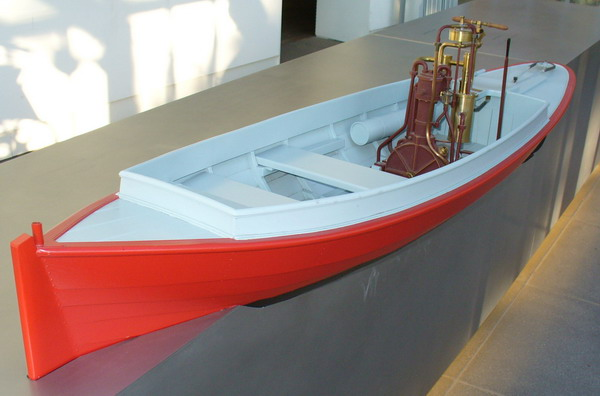
Daimler 1885 Engine in a boat

In 1882, Maybach moved to Taubenheimstrasse in Cannstatt, Stuttgart, where Daimler had purchased a house with 75,000 goldmarks from his Deutz compensation. They added a brick extension to the glass-fronted summer house in the garden, which became their workshop.

Their activities alarmed the neighbours, who suspected they were engaged in counterfeiting. The police raided the property in their absence using the gardener's key, but found only engines.

== The Daimler engine ==
In late 1883, Daimler and Maybach patented the first of their engines fueled by Ligroin. This engine was patented on 16 December 1883. It achieved Daimler's goal of being small and running fast enough to be useful at 750 rpm (soon after up to 900). Daimler had three engines built in 1884. Maybach persuaded him to put one in a vehicle, the result being the Reitwagen.

In 1884, Maybach's second son Adolf was born.

== The "Grandfather Clock engine" (1885) ==
By the end of 1885, Maybach and Daimler developed the first of their engines, which is regarded as a precursor to all modern petrol engines. It featured:

- single vertical cylinder
- air cooling
- large cast-iron flywheel
- revolutionary hot tube ignition (Patent 28022)
- exhaust valve controlled by a camshaft allowing high speeds
- a speed of 600 rpm, when at the time most engines could only achieve about 120 to 180 rpm.

In 1885, they created the first float-fed carburetor, which mixed evaporated gasoline with air to allow its efficient use as fuel. It was used that year on a larger but still compact version of the engine, now with a vertical cylinder, that featured:

- 1 Horsepower at 600 rpm output
- 100 cc engine displacement
- non cooled insulated cylinder with unregulated hot-tube ignition (patent DRP-28-022).

Daimler baptized it the Standuhr (lit. "grandfather clock"), because of its resemblance to a pendulum clock.

In November 1885, Daimler installed a smaller version of the engine onto a wooden bicycle, creating the first motorcycle (patent 36-423 – Vehicle with gas or petroleum engine), and Maybach drove it three kilometers from Cannstatt to Untertürkheim, reaching 12 km/h (7.5 mph). It became known as the Reitwagen.

On 8 March 1886, the inventors bought an American model coach built by Wilhelm Wimpff & Sohn, telling the neighbors that it was a birthday gift for Mrs. Daimler. Maybach supervised the installation of an enlarged 1.5 hp Grandfather Clock engine onto the coach, and installed a belt drive to the wheels. The vehicle reached 15 km/h (9.3 mph) when tested on the road to Untertürkheim.

Maybach and Daimler went on to prove the engine in many other ways, including:

- On water (1887). It was mounted in a 4.5-metre-long boat which achieved 6 knots (11 km/h). The boat was called the Neckar after the river it was tested on and was registered as patent number DRP 39-367. Motor boat engines would become their main product until the first decade of the 1900s.
- More road vehicles, including street cars.
- In the air. They built the first motorized airship, a balloon based on designs by Dr. Friedrich Hermann Wölfert from Leipzig. They replaced his hand-operated drive system and flew over Seelberg successfully on 10 August 1888.

By 1887 they were licensing their first patents abroad, and Maybach represented the company at the great Paris Exposition Universelle (1889).

== First Daimler-Maybach automobile built (1889) ==
Steel Wheel Automobile 1889
· high speed four-stroke petrol engine
· fuel vaporization
· 2 cylinders V-configured
· mushroom shaped valves
· water-cooled
· 4-speed toothed gearbox
· pioneer axle-pivot steering system

Sales increased, mostly from the Neckar motorboat. In June 1887, Daimler bought land in the Seelberg Hills of Cannstatt. The workshop was some distance from the town on Ludwig Route 67, because Cannstatt's mayor objected to the presence of the workshop in the town. It covered 2,903 square meters and cost 30,200 goldmarks. They initially employed 23 people. Daimler managed the commercial issues and Maybach the design department.

In 1889 they built their first automobile to be designed from scratch rather than as an adaptation of a stagecoach. It was publicly launched by both inventors in Paris in October 1889.

Daimler's engine licenses began to be taken up throughout the world, starting the modern car industry in:

- France, 1890, Panhard & Levassor and Peugeot
- United Kingdom, 1896, The Daimler Motor Company of Coventry
- United States of America, 1891, Steinway
- Austro-Daimler in Austria, starting in 1899

== Daimler's "pact with the devil", DMG, and the Phoenix engine (1890 to 1900) ==
Resources were scant to keep the business going, as neither the engine sales nor the worldwide proceeds from their patents were yielding enough money. Fresh capital was injected by bringing in the financiers Max von Duttenhofer and William Lorenz, former munitions makers, who were associated with Kilian von Steiner, the owner of a German investment bank. The company was taken public.

In 1890, Daimler and Maybach together founded the Daimler Motoren Gesellschaft, the Daimler Motor Corporation or DMG for short, which was dedicated to the construction of small high-speed internal combustion engines for land, water, or air transport. Maybach was Chief Designer. After spending long hours debating which fuel was best to use in Otto's four-stroke engine, which had normally used methane gas as a fuel, they turned to petroleum which until then had been used mainly as a cleaner and sold in pharmacies.

The company's re-foundation took place on 28 November 1890. This has been regarded as a "pact with the devil" by some German historians, as the following decade was chaotic for Daimler and Maybach. DMG continued to expand, selling engines from Moscow to New York, and additional stationary engine-making capacity was added, but the belief continued that automobile production would not be profitable. The new chairmen planned to merge DMG and Deutz-AG, in spite of Daimler's disagreement with Nicolaus Otto.

Gottlieb Daimler and Chief Engineer Maybach preferred to produce automobiles and reacted against Duttenhofer and Lorenz in particular. Maybach was rejected as a member of the Board of Management and left the company on 11 February 1891, and continued his design work from his own house, financed by Daimler. In late 1892, he set up a shop in the ballroom of the former Hermann Hotel and Winter Garden where he employed 17 workers, five of which were paid by Daimler.

In 1894 Maybach designed his third engine model, together with Daimler and his son Paul. Used in the Phoenix, it gained worldwide attention, pioneering the use of four cylinders in the automobile and featuring:

- single block casting of cylinders, arranged vertically and parallel to each other
- camshaft controlled exhaust valves
- spray-nozzle carburetor (patented by Maybach in 1893)
- improved belt drive

Maybach's creations are considered among the finest motors of the late 19th century. His inventions became indispensable for any model by any automaker in the world. He became recognised as the backbone of France's early automobile industry, where he was hailed as the "King of Designers".

Daimler was forced out of his post as Technical Director at DMG and resigned in 1893, which damaged DMG's prestige. However, in 1894, a British industrialist, Frederick Simms, purchased the rights to the Phoenix engine for 350,000 marks and stabilised the company's finances. He also made it a condition that Daimler be re-employed. In 1895 DMG assembled its 1,000th engine, and Maybach also returned as Chief Engineer, obtaining 30,000 goldmarks worth of shares through his original contract with Gottlieb Daimler.

Maybach patented more automobile inventions, including:

- a revolutionary cooling system, tubular radiator with fan
- the honeycomb radiator

Around this time though Maybach suffered two setbacks. His teenage second son, Adolf, suffered a schizophrenia attack and spent the rest of his life in various mental institutions. (In 1940, his son was murdered by the Nazis as part of the Euthanasia Program.) In 1900, Gottlieb Daimler died of heart disease.

== Daimler-Mercedes engine of 1900 ==
Mercedes 35 hp (1902)
· Large wheelbase. Wide track
· Pressed steel framework. Lightweight metals
· Low center of gravity (lower engine)
· 75 km/h (45 mph). 35 hp (950 rpm)
· 300 to 1000 rpm (driver controlled)
· Light and high-performance engine: 4 in-line cylinders
· Bore/stroke ratio: 116x140 mm
· Displacement: 5918 cc
· Cylinder heads part of the castings
· Two carburetors, one for each cylinder pair
· Driver controlled intake valve throttling
· Two camshafts
· 4-forward/1-reverse transmission
· Low voltage ignition magnetos
· Aluminium crankcase (pioneer), horizontally divided
· Honeycomb radiator
· Comfortable ride

Between April and October 1900, Maybach designed a completely new kind of car inspired by racing which would be called the Mercedes 35 hp when released in 1902. It featured:

- long wheelbase
- wide track
- low height
- unheard-of power from its 35 hp engine allowing it to reach 75 km/h (47 mph).

Emil Jellinek, a successful Austrian dealer and racing driver on the French Riviera who greatly admired Maybach's work, promised to buy a shipment of 36 automobiles for 550,000 goldmarks if Maybach could design a great race car for him following his specifications.

The prototype was finished in December 1900 and, in 1901 went on to have a string of racing successes. Its engine was baptized Daimler-Mercedes (Spanish for mercy) after Mercedes Jellinek, Emil's 10-year–old daughter. European high society bought the car in large numbers making it the commercial success that convinced the company directors there was a future in automobiles. Production increased greatly and DMG rapidly increased in size and number of employees. DMG officially registered the Mercedes trademark in June 1902.

In 1902, a fire destroyed DMG's Cannstatt facilities and the company moved to Stuttgart-Untertürkheim. Maybach continued with his innovations:

- a 6-cylinder/70 hp engine (1903–04)
- a pioneer aircraft engine: a high speed racing engine of 120 hp, with overhead inlet and exhaust valves and double ignition (1906)

DMG demoted him to an "Inventor's Office" causing him to leave the company again in 1907. DMG replaced him with Paul Daimler. That same year, the German Engineers Association (VDI) recognized Wilhelm Maybach as an honorary member.

== Zeppelin engines (1908) ==
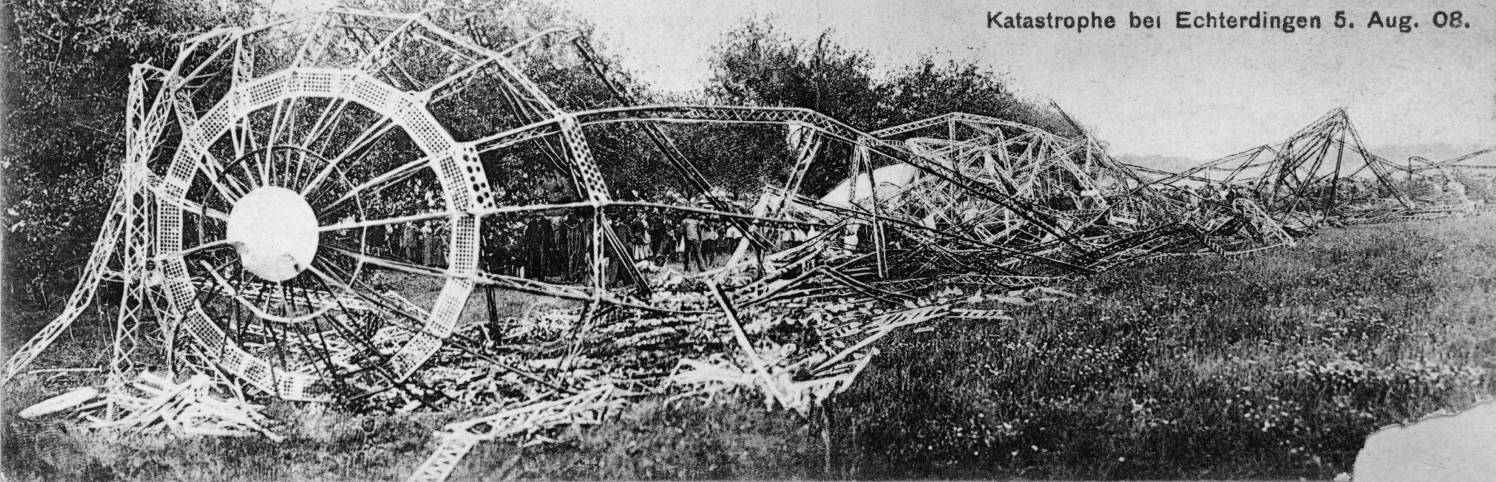
Wreckage of LZ4

In 1900, Maybach had his first contact with Count Ferdinand von Zeppelin who sought to improve the engines of the Zeppelin LZ1 airship. Maybach built some engines for him based on sketches of a 150 hp unit created by his son, Karl, while at DMG.

In 1908, Count Zeppelin attempted to sell his models LZ3 and LZ4 to the government. On 5 August, LZ4 exploded against a row of trees after attempting an emergency landing when its engines failed. This was far from being the end for the airship project as 6.25 million goldmarks were raised in a donation campaign after the accident. Count Zeppelin founded the Luftschiffbau Zeppelin GmbH, the company that built the Zeppelin airships.

Maybach had to hold off joining the new company for a while as he was still in litigation with DMG, so Karl took his place. On 23 March 1909, a deal was finally signed, creating an engine subsidiary to Luftschiffbau Zeppelin at Bissingen/Enz, in Württemberg. Wilhelm Maybach was Technical Assistant and Karl was Technical Manager. Their first designs reached 72 km/h (45 mph).

Wilhelm Maybach moved his company to Friedrichshafen and renamed it Luftfahrzeug-Motoren-GmbH. Karl and Wilhem held 20% of the shares with an arrangement for Karl to inherit. They kept supplying Zeppelin, but worked on other airship engines too. In 1912, the company adopted the name Maybach-Motorenbau GmbH (Maybach Engine Construction Company). In 1916, they developed a 160 hp aircraft engine which sold 2000 units before the end of World War I. In 1916, Wilhelm Maybach was awarded an Honorary Doctorate by the Technical University of Stuttgart.

== Maybach automobiles (1922–1945) ==
After the First World War, the Versailles Treaty of 1919 prohibited airship production in Germany, so Maybach turned to making high-speed diesel engines for naval and railroad use, and petrol engines for automobiles, but not complete automobiles.

Many of the small automakers in Germany built their own engines for cost reasons and only the Dutch Spyker company was interested in taking Maybach engines. Wilhelm Maybach turned down the contract because he could not agree to its conditions. Instead, he opted to build complete automobiles and the factory began to produce Maybach limousines in 1921.

The first model, the Maybach W3, was shown at the 1921 Automobile Exposition in Berlin and featured

- 6-cylinder engine
- 4-wheel brakes
- new transmission system
- maximum speed of 105 km/h (65 mph)

It was produced until 1928, selling 300 units, mostly with sedan bodies; the two-seat sport version was less successful. The Maybach W5 followed, with the top speed increased to 135 km/h (84 mph); 250 units sold in 1927 and 1929.

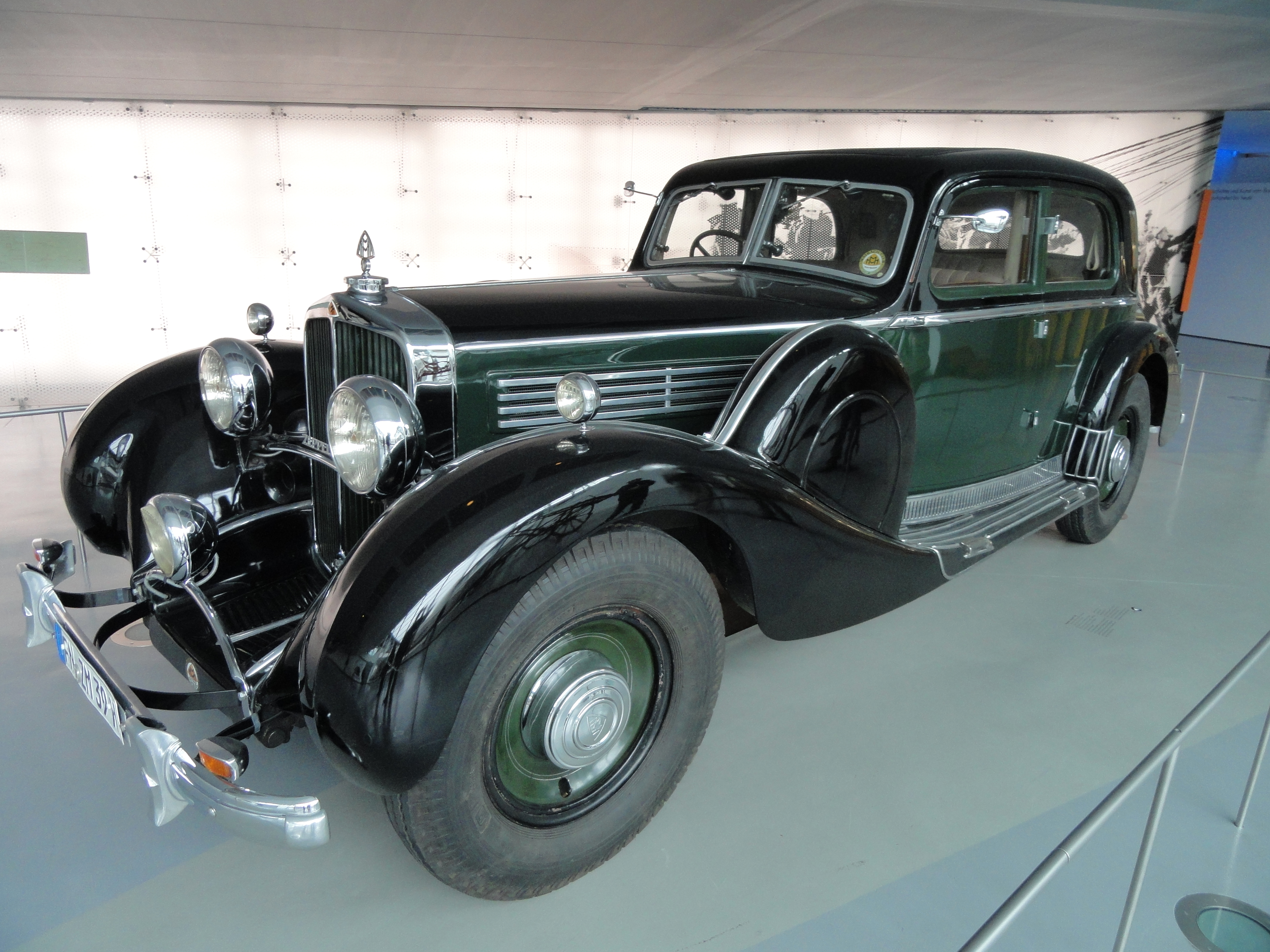
Maybach Zeppelin DS 8, 1938–39, exhibited in the Zeppelin Museum Friedrichshafen, Seestraße 22, Friedrichshafen, Germany

Next Maybach produced the V12 car:

- the first 12-cylinder German automobile
- lightweight aluminium engine based on his airship work
- light alloy pistons
- 7-litre capacity
- high torque and power – 150 hp (110 kW) at 2,800 rpm

Only a few dozen were sold due to the German postwar economic crisis. In 1930, its successor, the DS7-Zeppelin, also featured a 12-cylinder engine of 7 liters.

In August 1929, the Zeppelin LZ-127 used five Maybach-V12 petrol engines of 550 hp (410 kW) each.

Neither Wilhelm nor Karl owned a Maybach automobile. Wilhelm never even owned a car. "He, who created the basics for the modern automobilism, rarely utilized a car for his personal purposes. He walked or took the tram. Although he could have afforded one, he did not own a car."

Wilhelm Maybach died at the age of 83 in Stuttgart on 29 December 1929.

== Maybach Motorenbau GmbH ==
His business, Maybach Motorenbau GmbH, continued in Friedrichshafen under his son Karl Maybach. From around 1935 Maybach made and designed almost all the engines for tanks and half-tracks used by the German armed forces during World War 2. After 1945 it manufactured a full range of diesel engines. In the early 1960s Maybach began to construct large Daimler-Benz engines in Friedrichshafen under a licence agreement and entered close collaboration with Daimler-Benz.

During the mid 1960s Maybach Motorenbau GmbH became Maybach Mercedes-Benz Motorenbau GmbH and 83 percent owned by Daimler-Benz.

In 1998 Mercedes-Benz announced what would prove to be a temporary revival of the Maybach brand for automobiles. Daimler AG currently produces an ultra luxury edition of the Mercedes-Benz S-Class under the Mercedes-Maybach brand.

== Legacy ==
- Wilhelm Maybach was accepted into the Automotive Hall of Fame in 1996.
- Three technical Schools in Germany are named Wilhelm Maybach: Stuttgart, Heilbronn, and Berlin-Spandau.
- In 2002, Daimler AG began to produce models under the Maybach name.
- In 2005, in honor of his grandfather Karl and his great-grandfather Wilhelm, Ulrich Schmid-Maybach founded the Wilhelm and Karl Maybach Foundation.

== See also ==
- Mercedes Simplex
- Mercedes-Benz
- German inventors and discoverers

== Bibliography ==
- Kirchberg, Peter; Wächtler, Eberhard (1981). Carl Benz Gottlieb Daimler Wilhelm Maybach. Biographien hevorragender Naturwissenschaftler, Techniker und Mediziner series, Vol 52 (in German) (2nd ed.). Wiesbaden: Vieweg Verlag. ISBN 9783322822185.
- Niemann, Harry: Mythos Maybach, 4. Aufl., Stuttgart 2002
- Niemann, Harry: Maybach – der Vater des Mercedes, 3. Aufl., Stuttgart 2000
- Niemann, Harry: Wilhelm Maybach – König der Konstrukteure, 1. Aufl., Stuttgart 1995
- Rathke, Kurt: Wilhelm Maybach – Anbruch eines neuen Zeitalters, 1. Aufl., Friedrichshafen 1953
- Rauck, Max J.: Wilhelm Maybach: der grosse Automobilkonstrukteur. Baar 1979.
- Dokumentarfilm im Auftrag der Mercedes-Benz AG 1995: Wilhelm Maybach – König der Konstrukteure
