= Emil Jellinek =

German automobile entrepreneur (1853–1918)

Emil Jellinek-Mercedes
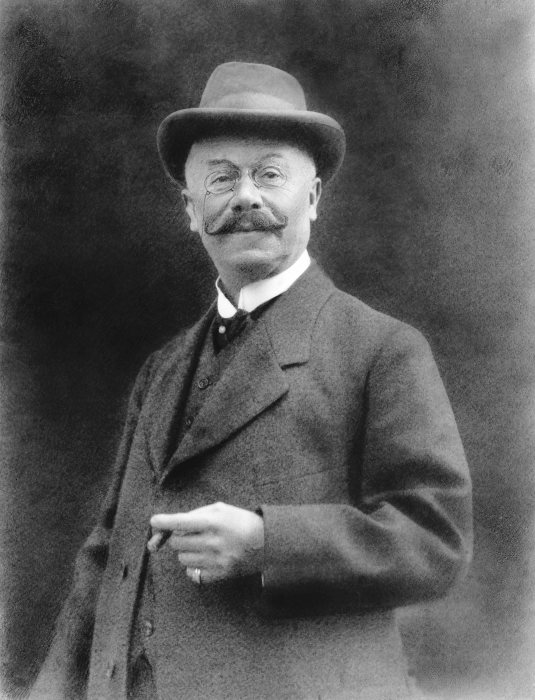
- Born: Emil Jellinek; 6 April 1853; Leipzig, Saxony
- Died: 21 January 1918 (aged 64); Geneva, Switzerland
- Occupation: Engineer
- Known for: Mercedes car brand

Emil Jellinek, known after 1903 as Emil Jellinek-Mercedes (6 April 1853 – 21 January 1918), was an automobile entrepreneur of the Daimler Motoren Gesellschaft (DMG), responsible in 1900 for commissioning the first modern automobile, the Mercedes 35hp. Jellinek created the Mercedes trademark in 1902, naming it in honor of his daughter, Mercédès Jellinek.

The trademark developed into the company Mercedes-Benz, and the marque became one of the largest car brands in the world. Jellinek lived in Vienna, Austria, then later moved to Nice, on the French Riviera, where he was General Consul of Austria-Hungary.

== Early life ==
Jellinek was born in Leipzig, Germany, the son of Adolf Jellinek (sometimes known as Aaron Jellinek). His father was a well-known Czech-Hungarian rabbi and intellectual in the Jewish communities of Leipzig and Vienna. Jellinek's mother, Rosalie Bettelheim (born 1832 in Budapest, died 1892 in Baden bei Wien), was an active rebbetzin. He had two brothers, both of whom achieved fame: Max Hermann Jellinek, as a linguist, and Georg Jellinek, as an international law teacher. His sisters were Charlotte and Pauline.

The family moved, shortly after Jellinek's birth, to Vienna. He found paying attention to school work difficult and dropped out of several schools, including Sonderhausen. His parents were displeased with his performance, while Jellinek began to indulge in practical jokes. In 1870, when he was 17, his parents found him a job as a clerk in a Moravian railway company, Rot-Koestelec North-Western. Jellinek worked two years before being fired by management, upon discovery that he had been organising train races late at night.

== Diplomat and businessman (1872 to 1893) ==
In 1872, when 19 years old, he moved to France. There, through his father's connections, Schmidl, the Austro-Hungarian Consul in Morocco, requested his services, getting Jellinek diplomatic posts at Tangier and Tetouan, successively. In Tetouan, he met Rachel Goggmann, an Algerian-born illegitimate daughter of a Sephardi mother, Meriem Azoulay, adopted by the husband of the mother, Moise Goggmann (Gogman), a Jew from Lorraine.

In 1874, Jellinek was conscripted for military service in Vienna, but was declared unfit. He resumed his diplomatic career as Austrian vice-consul at Oran, Algeria, and also began trading Algerian tobacco to Europeans, in partnership with Rachel's father.

He also worked as an inspector for the French Aigle insurance company and traveled to Vienna briefly in 1881 at the age of 28 to open one of its branch offices. Returning to Oran, he married Rachel, and their first two sons Adolph and Fernand were born there.

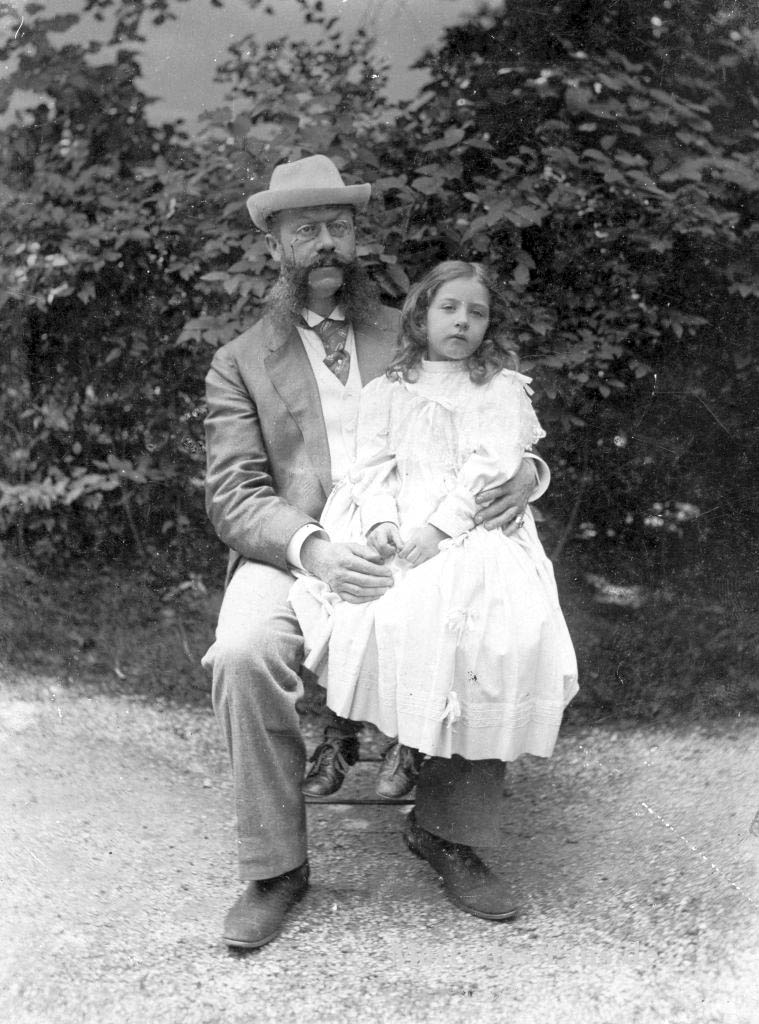
Jellinek with his daughter Mercedes, whose name he also gave to the Mercedes automobile brand

Two years later, in 1884, Jellinek joined the insurance company full-time and moved with the family to Baden bei Wien, Austria, where they lived in the house of a wine dealer named Hanni. His first daughter, Mercédès Jellinek, was born in Baden on 16 September 1889; the name Mercédès means "favor", "kindness", "mercy", or "pardon" in Spanish. Rachel died four years later, and was buried in Nice. Even so, Jellinek came to believe the name Mercedes brought good fortune and called all his properties after it. One of his sons wrote: He was as superstitious as the ancient Romans.

Jellinek's insurance business and stock-market trading became very successful, and they started to spend the winters in Nice on the fashionable French Riviera, eventually moving there and establishing links with both international business people and the local aristocracy.

Helped by his diplomatic career, he became the Austrian Consul General in Nice, and began selling automobiles, mainly French makes, to European aristocrats spending winter vacations in the region. Associated with the automobile business were Leon Desjoyeaux, from Nice, and Alsatian cyclist Karl Lehmann, who acquired the sole French agency and adopted the alias of "C. L. Charley". Jellinek acquired a large mansion which he named Villa Mercedes to run the business from and by 1897 he was selling about 140 cars a year and started calling them "Mercedes". The car business was by now more profitable than his insurance work.

It was in Nice that Jellinek became enthralled by the automobile, studying any information that he could gather about it and purchasing successively: a De Dion-Bouton, a Léon-Bollée Voiturette, both three-wheelers, and a four-seat Benz motorized-coach. Jellinek greatly admired automobile designer Wilhelm Maybach's work. He promised to buy a shipment of 36 automobiles for 550,000 goldmarks if Maybach could design a great race car for him following his specifications. The prototype was finished in December 1900 and, in 1901 went on to have a string of racing successes. Its engine was baptized Daimler-Mercedes.

In 1899, he married Madelaine Henriette Engler (Anaise Jellinek), and had four more children: Alain Didier, Guy, Rene and Andree (Maya).

== Daimler Motoren Gesellschaft (DMG), 1896–1900 ==
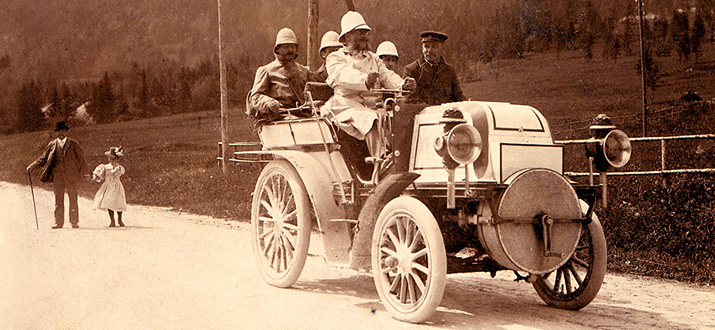
Emil Jellinek driving his Phoenix Double-Phaeton

Seeing an advertisement for a DMG car in the weekly magazine Fliegende Blätter, Jellinek, now aged 43, travelled to Cannstatt, (near Stuttgart), in 1896, to find out more about the company, its factory, and the designers Gottlieb Daimler and Wilhelm Maybach. He placed an order for one of the Daimler cars and took delivery in October of that year.

The car, a Phoenix Double-Phaeton with 8 hp engine, could reach 24 km/h (15 mph). Maybach had designed the DMG-Phoenix engine, which featured four cylinders for the first time in a car, in 1894, when staying at Stuttgart's former Hermann Hotel.

DMG seemed a reliable enterprise, so Jellinek decided to start selling its cars. In 1898, he wrote to DMG requesting six more cars and to become a DMG main agent and distributor. In 1899, he sold 10 cars and 29 in 1900. Among French car-makers such as Peugeot, Panhard & Levassor and other makers licensed to sell Daimler-engined vehicles in France there was a shortage of cars, and Jellinek benefited by being able to beat other suppliers' lengthy waiting-times.

Jellinek kept contacting DMG's designers with his ideas, some were good, but often with harangues, such as "Your manure wagon has just broken down on schedule"; "Your car is the chrysalis and I want the butterfly"; and "Your engineers should be locked up in an insane asylum." This annoyed Daimler, but Maybach took notice of many of his suggestions.

Every year in March, the French Riviera celebrated a speed-week, attracting many members of the local high-society. The events included:

- Nice-Castellane 90k (90 km long-distance race)
- Magagnosc (touring race)
- Promenade des Anglais (sprint race)
- Nice-La Turbie (hill-climb race)
- Monte Carlo (concours d'elegance)

In 1899, Jellinek entered his cars in all of them. As the usage of pseudonyms was common, he called his race-team Mercedes and this was visibly written on the cars' chassis. Monsieur Mercedes became his personal alias and he became well known by it in the region.

Using the DMG-Phoenix, Jellinek easily won all the races, reaching 35 km/h (22 mph), but he was still not satisfied with the car.

== The Mercedes 35hp (1900) ==
Mercedes 35 hp (1900)
Long wheelbase. Wide track.
Pressed steel chassis.
Low center of gravity (lower engine).
75 km/h (45 mph). 35 hp (950 rpm). 300 to 1000 rpm (driver controlled).
Light high-performance engine: 4 cylinders. Bore/stroke ratio: 116x140 mm. Displacement: 5918 cc. Cylinder heads part of the castings. Carburetor for each pair of cylinders. Controlled intake valves. Two camshafts.
Low-voltage ignition magnetos.
Aluminium crankcase (pioneer), horizontally divided.
Honeycomb radiator.
Wheel steering.

In 1899, DMG commissioned some engineers including Wilhelm Bauer, Wilhelm Werner and Hermann Braun, to investigate the possibility of using the Phoenix for sporting events as at that time car racing was the best way of generating publicity in Europe.

On 30 March 1900, Wilhelm Bauer decided spontaneously to enter the Nice-La Turbie hill climb but crashed fatally after hitting a rock on the first turn while avoiding spectators. This caused DMG to abandon racing.

Nonetheless, Jellinek came to an agreement with DMG on 2 April 1900, by promising the large sum of 550,000 Goldmark if Wilhelm Maybach would design a revolutionary sports car for him, to be called the Mercedes, of which 36 units had to be delivered before 15 October. The deal also included an order for 36 standard DMG 8 hp cars. Jellinek also became a member of DMG's Board of Management and obtained the exclusive dealership for the new Mercedes for France, Austria, Hungary, Belgium and United States of America. Jellinek had some legal problems over the use of the Daimler name in France with Panhard Levassor who owned the Daimler licences for France, and the use of the Mercedes name put an end to that problem.

Apparently Jellinek laid down a strict specification for the Mercedes stating "I don't want a car for today or tomorrow, it will be the car of the day after tomorrow". He itemized many new parameters to overcome the problems found in many of the ill-designed "horseless carriages" of the time which made them unsuitable for high speeds and at risk of overturning:

- Long wheelbase and wide track to provide stability.
- Engine to be better located on the car's chassis.
- Lower center of gravity.
- Electric ignition using the new Bosch system (in lieu of a gas heated glow tube).

The model would be officially called the Daimler-Mercedes which the DMG chairman accepted readily as it overcame the problem of the Daimler name in France being owned by Panhard & Levassor.

Over the next few months, Jellinek oversaw the development of the new car at first by daily telegrams and later by traveling to Stuttgart. He took delivery of the first one on 22 December 1900, at Nice's railway station – it had already been sold to the Baron Henri de Rothschild who had also raced cars in Nice.

In 1901, the car amazed the automobile world. Jellinek again won the Nice races, easily beating his opponents in all the capacity classes and reaching 60 km/h (37 mph). The director of the French Automobile Club, Paul Meyan, stated: "We have entered the Mercedes era", a sentiment echoed by newspapers worldwide.

The records set by the new Mercedes amazed the entire automobile world. DMG's sales shot up, filling its Stuttgart plant to full capacity and consolidating its future as a car making company. The number of employees steadily increased from 340 in 1900 to 2,200 in 1904. In 1902, on 23 June, the company decided to use the Mercedes name as the trademark for its entire automobile production and officially registered it on 26 September.

== Life after the Mercedes success (1900 to 1914) ==
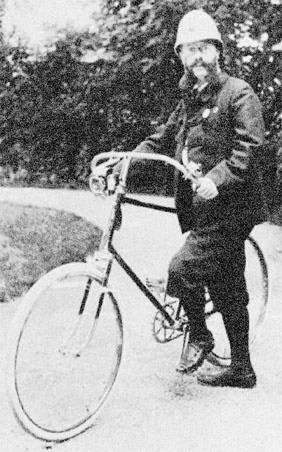
Jellinek before 1903

As well as shaving off his side-whiskers, the overjoyed Emil Jellinek, in Vienna in June 1903 at the age of 50, changed his name to Jellinek-Mercedes, commenting: "This is probably the first time that a father has taken his daughter's name". From then on, he signed himself E.J. Mercédès.

Jellinek and his enthusiastic associates were distributing DMG-Mercedes models worldwide, six hundred were sold by 1909, making millions for DMG. He supplied cars to all 150 members of Nice's Automobile Club and also supported racing teams all over Europe. His life was absorbed by the business, spending much time away from home, and sending many telegrams.

As the 1900s continued, his passion for the Mercedes began to fade. He tired of the special requests being made by his highly demanding aristocratic customers. He also became disillusioned by DMG's technical department which he called "those donkeys" and built his own large repair facilities at Nice behind Villa Mercedes. Wilhelm Maybach, his favorite designer, left DMG in 1907. He also so angered DMG's chairman that in 1908 he permanently cancelled Jellinek's original contract.

His diplomatic career continued and he was Austro-Hungarian Consulate General in successively Nice (1907), Mexico, and Monaco. In 1909, when in Monte Carlo, Jellinek finally severed his commercial activities to concentrate on his consular work but did purchase some casinos in the region.

== First World War, his last years (1914 to 1918) ==
Just before war broke out in 1914, the Austrian government charged Jellinek for taxes on his French properties. The family then moved to Semmering, Austria. While being treated at a sanatorium in Bad Kissingen by Dr. Von Dapper, he ceded the Baden mansion to his family, writing: "(The Baden Villa) disturbs me terribly, I cannot sleep and that is detrimental to my health!"

When Austria-Hungary entered war on 28 July 1914, Jellinek and his family stopped speaking French outside their property. Later that year, they moved to Meran (France) but there, he was accused of espionage for Germany, supposedly hiding saboteurs in his Mediterranean yachts. At the same time, the Austrians suspected his wife, Anaise.

Fleeing in 1917, they ended up in Geneva, in neutral Switzerland, where Emil Jellinek was temporarily arrested again. He stayed there until his death on 21 January 1918, at the age of 64. All his French properties were later forfeited. Since 1982, his remains have been resting near Rachel's tomb, in Nice's Catholic Cemetery.

A decade after his death, in 1926, amid the German post-war crisis, DMG merged with Benz to become the Daimler-Benz company with their automobiles called Mercedes-Benz. Daimler-Benz purchased Chrysler in 1998 and became DaimlerChrysler until August 2007, when Chrysler was sold off to Cerberus Capital Management. The company is now known as the Mercedes-Benz Group.

== Jellinek-Mercedes's properties ==
In the Mercedes global boom in 1900, Jellinek-Mercedes purchased several properties including:

- Mercedes exhibition room in the Champs-Élysées, Paris.
- Grand hotels: Royal and Scribe in Nice and the Astoria, in Paris.

His most important properties were:

- Villa Mercedes in Nice. No. 57, Promenade des Anglais.
- Villa Mercedes II in Nice. No. 54, Promenade des Anglais. Bought in 1902.
- Villa Jellinek-Mercedes, Wienerstrasse 39–45, in Baden (next to the original vineyard house). Purchasing it as a building plot in 1891, Jellinek built a large mansion, adding to it progressively from 1909 until it had 50 rooms, 8 bathrooms and 23 toilets. During the battle of Berlin in 1945 the villa was destroyed and only the garage as well as two rooms were left. Afterwards, the land was divided and sold and is now occupied by a gas station and a smaller building built in 1900.
- Château Robert. An immense house located between Toulon and Nice. Officially it was Jellinek's private residence, though he spent most of the time in the Villa Mercedes of Nice.

== See also ==
- Daimler Motoren Gesellschaft
- Mercedes-Benz
- Wilhelm Maybach
- Mercedes 35hp
- Jellinek

== Bibliography ==
- "My Father Mr. Mercedes". Jellinek-Mercedes, Guy (translated by Ruth Hassell). G.T. Foulis & Co. Ltd, 1966, 319 pp.

== See also ==
=== Documentaries ===
- Monsieur Mercedes : La naissance d'une étoile (in French), documentary directed by Lorenz Findeisen, ZDF / Arte / ORF, 2026, 44 min.
