= Mercedes 35 hp =

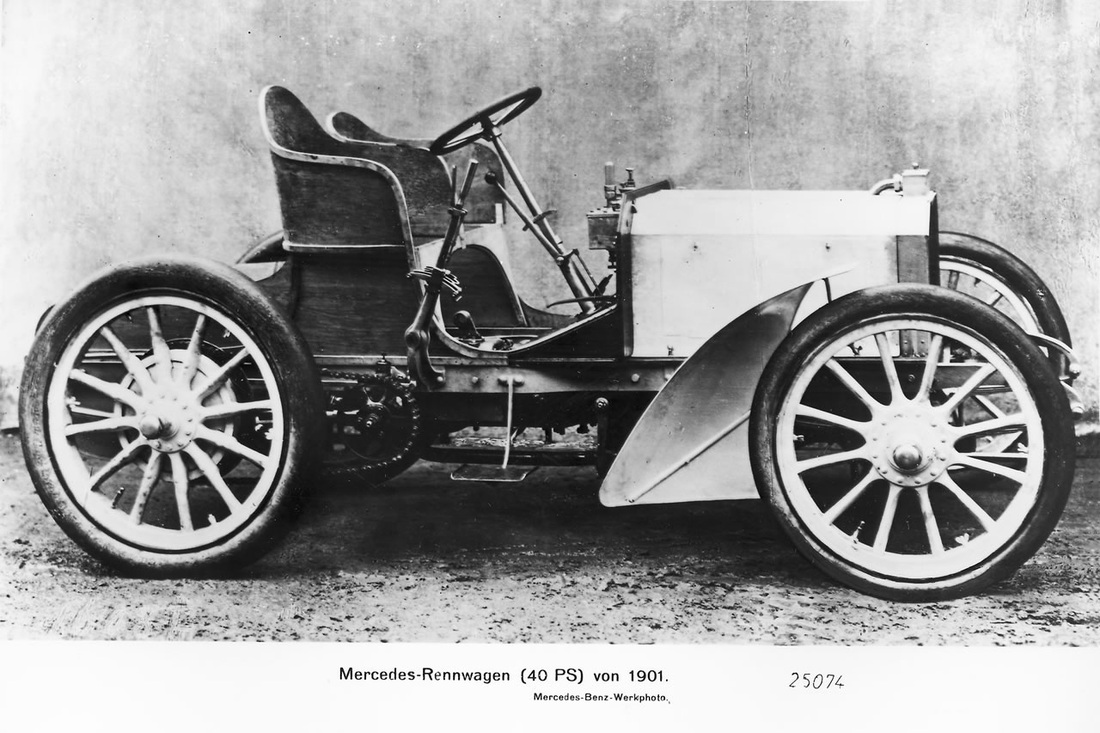

Overview
- Manufacturer: Mercedes
- Also called: Mercedes 35 CV; Mercedes 35 PS
- Production: 1901–1901
- Model years: 1901
- Designer: Wilhelm Maybach; Paul Daimler

Body and chassis
- Body style: Phaeton
- Layout: Front Engine RWD
- Chassis: Pressed Steel Ladder Chassis

Powertrain
- Engine: 5,918 cc (361.1 cu in; 5.9 L) Inline 4 (116 mm × 140 mm; 4.57 in × 5.51 in)
- Power output: 35 PS (34.5 bhp; 25.7 kW) @ 950 rpm 57 lb⋅ft (77.3 N⋅m) @ 400 rpm
- Transmission: 4-speed manual transmission + 1 reverse

Dimensions
- Wheelbase: 2,345 mm (92.3 in)
- Length: 2,766 mm (108.9 in)
- Width: 1,345 mm (53.0 in)
- Height: 1,300 mm (51.2 in)
- Curb weight: 1,200 kg (2,645.5 lb)

Chronology
- Predecessor: Daimler Phoenix
- Successor: Mercedes Simplex

The Mercedes 35 hp (German: Mercedes 35 PS) was a radical early car model designed in 1901 by Wilhelm Maybach and Paul Daimler, for Emil Jellinek. Produced in Stuttgart, Germany, by Daimler-Motoren-Gesellschaft (DMG), it began the Mercedes line of cars (since 1926 re-branded Mercedes-Benz). Its name is derived from the power of the engine, 35 Pferdestärken (26 kW, approximately 35 horsepower).

A significant advancement over the previous generation of automobiles, which were modified stagecoaches, the Mercedes 35 hp is regarded as the first modern car. It was equipped with a powerful petrol engine, it was both wider and larger with a tailored steel chassis, and its centre of mass was near the ground. Originally designed as a racing car, the Mercedes 35 hp was further developed for normal road use.

== Historical background ==
In the 19th century, Wilhelm Maybach's career as an industrial designer had been with Gottlieb Daimler in their Cannstatt workshop (near Stuttgart), at which together they had pioneered the petrol engine production and were responsible for designing and making some of the world's first automobiles. By 1900, Maybach was the chief engineer within the Daimler Motoren Gesellschaft (DMG), (Note: After the 1926 merger with the rival Benz & Cie., the company name was changed to Daimler-Benz AG. The brand of cars became Mercedes-Benz at this point. In 1998, Daimler-Benz AG merged with Chrysler, becoming DaimlerChrysler AG until the disposal of Chrysler in 2007, when the company name was changed to Daimler AG.) which had been an expansion of their previous company that originated from their small workshop. He never got along with the new capitalist board, and later left to join Ferdinand von Zeppelin. In 1900, Gottlieb Daimler died and his son Paul Daimler had taken his place beside Maybach.

=== Origin of the name "Mercedes" ===
Emil Jellinek was a wealthy Austrian businessman and Austro-Hungarian diplomat living in Nice on the French Riviera. His daughter Adriana Manuela Ramona Jellinek, 10 years old at the car's construction, was given the nickname "Mercédès". Jellinek used to name his possessions after her, such as his mansions, the automobiles he sold, his racing car team, etc.. He himself was often known as Monsieur Mercedes.

As an avid fan of the DMG brand, Jellinek had signed up two DMG-Phoenix cars for competing in the Nice-La Turbie race on 30 March 1900, introducing the Mercedes name for both his racing team and its cars. A tragedy ensued when Wilhelm Bauer, the chief mechanic of DMG, raced one of the cars and was killed after the first curve of the race. Consequently, DMG canceled all further involvement in motorsport.

Nonetheless, Jellinek persuaded DMG to design a new model for competing again. He insisted that the powerful engine should be developed by both Maybach and Paul Daimler and be named Daimler-Mercedes, after his daughter. This wish was granted because the Daimler brand of the DMG had been already conceded to the French Panhard carmaker for all France.

== Development ==
Jellinek specified revolutionary improvements. Unlike the previous generation of cars, unstable motorized coaches of narrow high bodies which were so prone to overturn, the novel Mercedes should be longer, wider, and of a lower centre of gravity. Also it would have a light steel body and strong chassis, onto which the engine would be firmly fixed near the ground and lowering the car's centre of gravity. 36 of these cars would be delivered, for the large sum of ℳ500,000.

Over the following months of 1900 Jellinek oversaw the process closely, at first through daily telegrams, and subsequently, by travelling personally. Maybach tested the new car for the first time on 22 November and Jellinek received his first delivery on 22 December 1900.

In January 1901, Emil Jellinek's Mercedes team tested six of the new Mercedes 35 hp in the Pau Grand Prix, but the racecar was of a disappointing performance by multiple technical complications and enduring just for few laps. However, in the Nice-La Turbie event of March 1901, it was much different. Jellinek participated through five Mercedes 35 hp and the German driver Wilhelm Werner. The cars dominated the race from start to finish with a record average speed of 51.4 km/h (31.9 mph), beating the previous 31.3 km/h (19.4 mph) and reaching top speeds of 86 km/h (53 mph). Those results easily outclassed all other competing cars in any capacity. The automotive world was so astonished that Paul Meyan, director of the French Automobile Club, stated: "We have entered the Mercedes era". (Note: F. Schildberger reported in 1968 that the original French quotation was « [n]ous sommes entrés dans l'ère Mercédès ».) Eventually, the road car achieved typical speeds of 70–75 km/h (43–47 mph). The racing version could exceed 85 km/h (53 mph).

In Stuttgart, DMG mounted two additional back seats on the Mercedes 35 hp, transforming it for a family car. Between March and August 1901, it manufactured two more Mercedes models, the 12/16 HP and the 8/11 HP. The Mercedes was so successful that the production lines of the DMG ran at full capacity. The Mercedes trademark was used on DMG production automobiles from 23 June 1902. It was formally registered on 26 September 1902.

In June 1903, Emil Jellinek changed his own name to Jellinek-Mercedes, stating: "This is probably the first time that a father has taken his daughter's name".

== Technical description ==
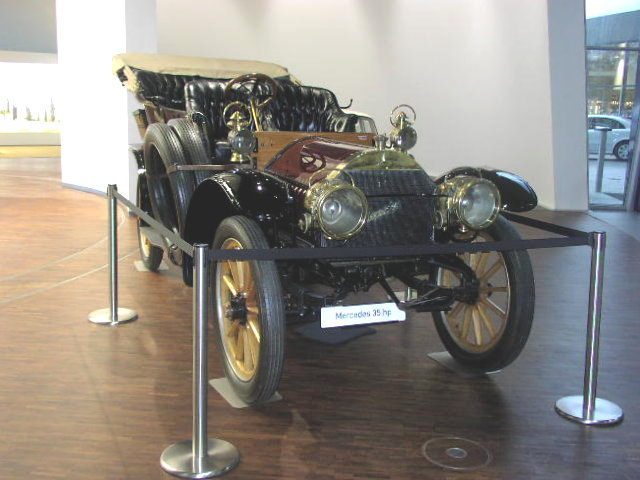
Mercedes 35hp with gas flame headlamp

=== Dimensions ===
The Mercedes 35 hp had a wheelbase of 2,345 mm (92.3 in) and a track of 1,400 mm (55 in). The total weight was also dramatically reduced to 1,200 kg (2,600 lb) by making the main chassis frame of pressed steel of carefully designed U-shaped cross section.

The relatively light engine—230 kg (510 lb) with 6.6 kg/hp (15 lb/hp)—was mounted over the front axle without any extra subframes, so its centre of gravity was close to the ground.

=== Running gear ===
The wooden wheels of the Mercedes 35 hp were non-removable, featuring 12 spokes, steel covers and pneumatic tyres: 910 mm (36 in) tall, 90 mm (3.5 in) wide in front, and 1,020 mm (40 in) tall, 120 mm (4.7 in) wide in the rear.

There were two braking systems, one hand operated and the other by foot. The main brake was the hand brake which acted on the rear wheels which had 30 cm (12 in) drums. The secondary, foot brake, acted on the chain drive's intermediate shaft and was water-cooled.

Both axles were rigid, equipped with semi-elliptic springs. The steering-axles were designed to minimise transmission of road shocks to the driver. The steering column was inclined backwards unlike the vertical shaft on many of its contemporaries.

The engine of the Mercedes 35 hp was at the front of the car driving the rear wheels through a large roller chain. The gearshift was at the driver's right side, featuring a gate change system with four forward speeds and a reverse gear. The drum like compact clutch system was attached to the flywheel. The flywheel consisted of a self-adjustable coil spring made up of wound spring steel. The tension at which the clutch operated was regulated by a conical cam.

=== Engine ===
The main bearings were made of magnalium, an aluminium alloy with 5% magnesium. The crankcase was also made of aluminium. The four cylinders, cast in grey iron with fixed heads, gave a total displacement of 5.918 L (116 mm bore, 140 mm stroke), and were arranged in pairs each pair with a single spray-nozzle carburetor. The intake and exhaust valves were no longer opened by cylinder pressure but by two camshafts on the sides of the engine, driven by gears from the flywheel. There were two carburettors, one for each cylinder-pair.

The engine was started by a hand crank aided by the presence of a decompressor. The engine also incorporated a low-voltage magneto with make-and-break spark ignition. This was fitted at Jellinek's demand, replacing the antiquated hot tube system.

Cooling was provided by a pumped water system. Maybach's tubular radiator, patented in 1897, known as a honeycomb radiator, was similar to present-day ones. Its rectangular grille had 8,070 pipes with a square cross section of 6 mm × 6 mm (0.24 in × 0.24 in) to improve airflow, and held 9 L (2.0 imp gal; 2.4 US gal) of water. The airflow was assisted by a fan located behind the radiator.

The Mercedes 35 hp engine ran between 300 r/min and 1000 r/min, its speed controlled by the driver using a lever on the steering wheel. Its peak output was 35 hp at 950 r/min.

== See also ==
- Daimler Motoren Gesellschaft
- Emil Jellinek
- Timeline of most powerful production cars
- Mercedes Simplex
- List of Mercedes-Benz vehicles
