= Mercedes (car brand) =

German car brand

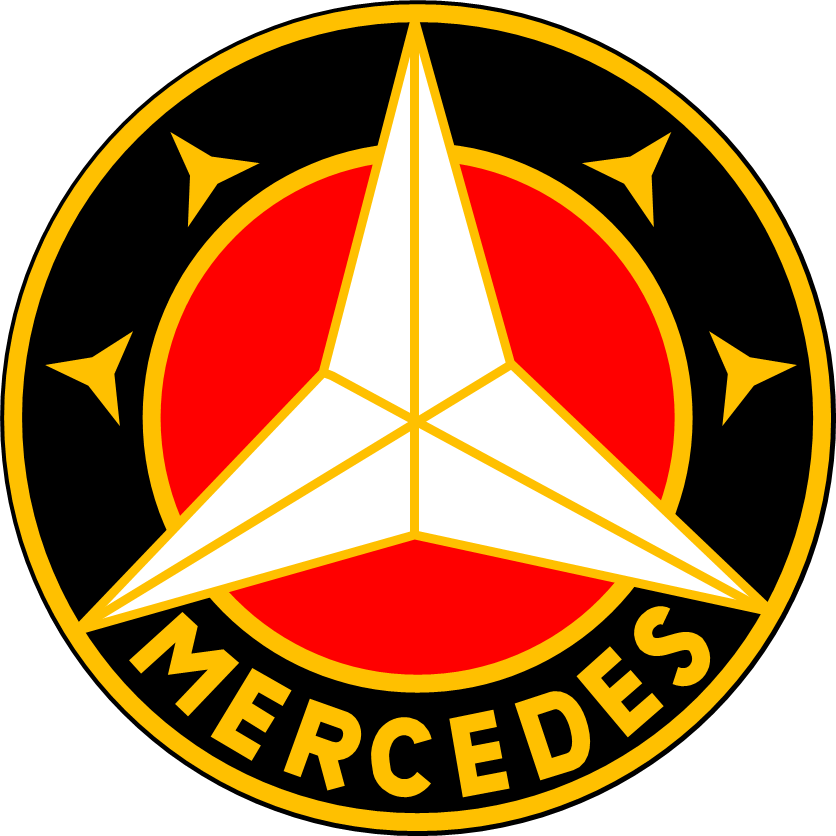
- Product type: Automobile
- Current owner: Mercedes-Benz Group (1926–) (Note: Previously, Daimler-Benz (1926–1998), DaimlerChrysler (1998–2007), Daimler AG (2007–2022).)
- Produced by: DMG (1901–26)
- Country: Germany
- Introduced: 1901; 125 years ago
- Discontinued: 1926; 100 years ago (succeeded by Mercedes-Benz)
- Markets: Worldwide
- Previous owners: DMG (1901–26)

Mercedes (German: [mɛʁˈtseːdəs, -dɛs]) was a brand originally created by the Daimler-Motoren-Gesellschaft (DMG) and used for first time in the 35 hp model released by the company in 1901. DMG began to develop in 1900, after the death of its co-founder, Gottlieb Daimler. Although the name was not lodged as a trade name until 23 June 1902 and not registered legally until 26 September, the brand name eventually would be applied to an automobile model built by Wilhelm Maybach to specifications by Emil Jellinek. This vehicle was delivered to him on 22 December 1900.

By Jellinek's contract, the new model contained a newly designed engine designated "Daimler-Mercedes". This engine name is the first instance of the use of the name Mercedes by DMG. The automobile design would later be called the Mercedes 35 hp. When DMG merged with Benz & Cie to form "Daimler-Benz" in 1926, the new company became owner of the Mercedes brand name.

== Overview ==
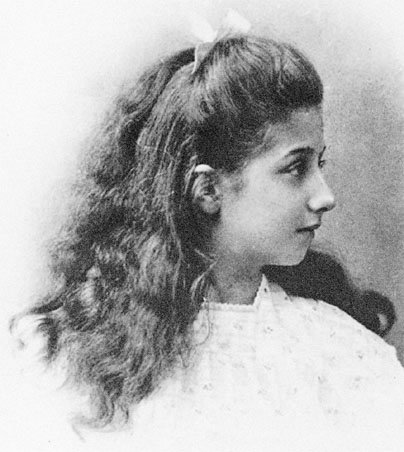
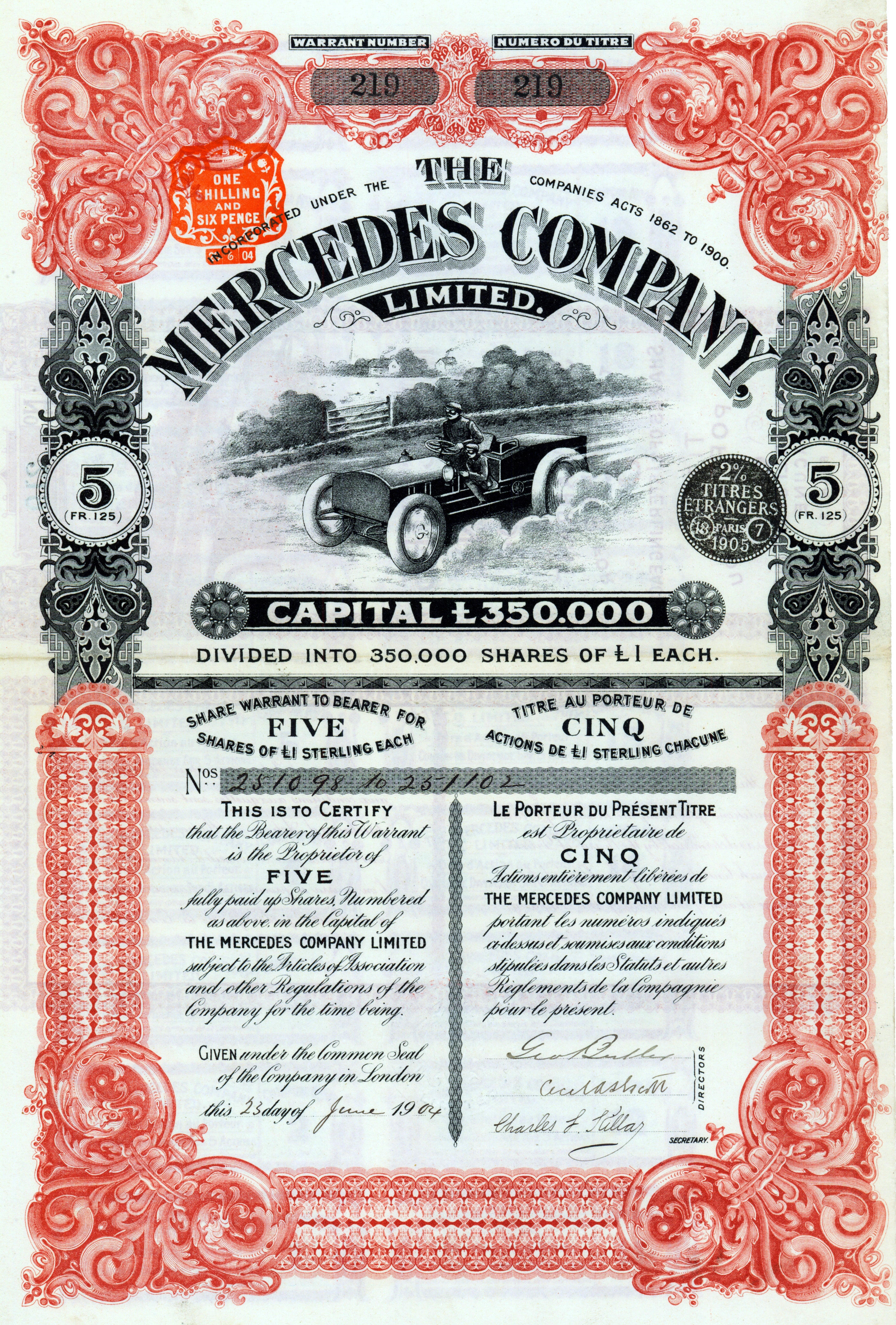
(Left): Mercédès, the daughter of Emil Jellinek, who had Daimler-Motoren-Gesellschaft's line of Mercedes cars named after her, beginning with the Mercedes 35 HP model of 1901;
(Right): Share of the Mercedes Company Limited, issued 23 June 1904; this British sales company was the first company which was allowed to sell Mercedes cars in England and in other countries. It was also allowed to have "Mercedes" in its name

Emil Jellinek was an Austrian-Jewish diplomat based in Nice who ran a profitable business selling cars, and, as a racing enthusiast, had been racing DMG automobiles under the pseudonym Mercédès, after his daughter, Mercédès Jellinek. Later he contracted with DMG for a small series of dedicated sports cars containing an engine that officially bore his daughter's name. He raced them very successfully, gaining recognition that increased interest in customers and Jellinek was placed on the board of directors of DMG. This model was a significant advancement in the history of automobiles. The model was released for sale in 1901 under the name of Mercedes 35 hp and, because of the success of the model, DMG began to apply the name as a series to other models such as, Mercedes 8/11 hp and Mercedes 40 hp Simplex. Jellinek seems to have become obsessed with the name and even had his name changed to Jellinek-Mercedes. Maybach quit DMG in 1907 and subsequently started up his own business.

The name Mercedes was later used to represent DMG in another new brand name, Mercedes-Benz. This was created in 1926 when it was applied to all vehicles produced by the new company, Daimler-Benz AG, resulting from the merger of Benz & Cie. and Daimler Motoren Gesellschaft in that year. The last name of Carl Benz was retained in the new brand, but since DMG had sold exclusive licences to foreign companies, they could not use the name of their founder, Daimler, legally in all countries and decided to use the name of their most popular model.

== History of the Mercedes series ==
Mercedes 35 hp
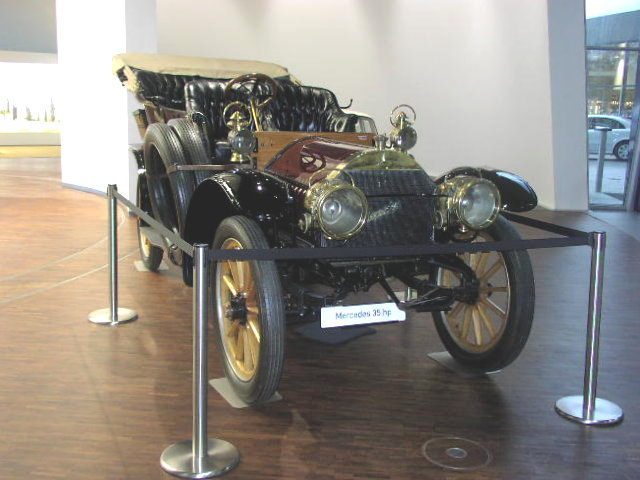

Overview
- Also called: Mercedes 35 CV; Mercedes 35 PS
- Production: 1901–1901
- Model years: 1901
- Designer: Wilhelm Maybach; Paul Daimler

Body and chassis
- Body style: Phaeton
- Layout: Front engine RWD
- Chassis: Pressed steal ladder chassis

Powertrain
- Engine: 5,918 cc (361.1 cu in; 5.9 L) Inline 4 (116 mm × 140 mm; 4.57 in × 5.51 in)
- Power output: 35 PS (34.5 bhp; 25.7 kW) @ 950 rpm 77.3 N⋅m (57 lb⋅ft) @ 400 rpm
- Transmission: 4-speed manual transmission + 1 reverse

Dimensions
- Wheelbase: 2,345 mm (92.3 in)
- Length: 2,766 mm (108.9 in)
- Width: 1,345 mm (53.0 in)
- Height: 1,300 mm (51.2 in)
- Curb weight: 1,200 kg (2,645.5 lb)

Chronology
- Predecessor: Daimler Phoenix
- Successor: Mercedes Simplex

Mercedes was a brand in the Daimler Motoren Gesellschaft (DMG) which began to develop in 1901, after the death of its co-founder, Gottlieb Daimler.

On 30 March 1900, a few weeks after the death of Gottlieb Daimler, Wilhelm Bauer decided spontaneously to enter the Nice-La Turbie hill climb, but crashed fatally after hitting a rock on the first turn while avoiding spectators. This caused DMG to abandon racing.

Nonetheless, Emil Jellinek came to an agreement with DMG on 2 April 1900 by promising the large sum of 550,000 Goldmark if Wilhelm Maybach would design a revolutionary sports car for him, later to be called the Mercedes 35 hp, of which 36 units had to be delivered before 15 October. The contract also included an order for 36 standard DMG 8 hp cars. Jellinek soon became a member of the DMG Board of Management and obtained the exclusive dealership for the model—that would become the new Mercedes 35 hp—for France, Austria, Hungary, Belgium, and United States of America. However, the first one was not delivered to Jellinek until 22 December.

Jellinek laid down strict specifications for the new model stating "I don't want a car for today or tomorrow, it will be the car of the day after tomorrow". He itemized many new parameters to overcome the problems found in many of the ill-designed "horseless carriages" of the time which made automobiles unsuitable for high speeds and at risk of overturning:

- Long wheelbase and wide track to provide stability
- Engine to be better positioned on the car's chassis
- Lower centre of gravity
- Electric ignition using the new Bosch system (in lieu of a gas heated glow tube)
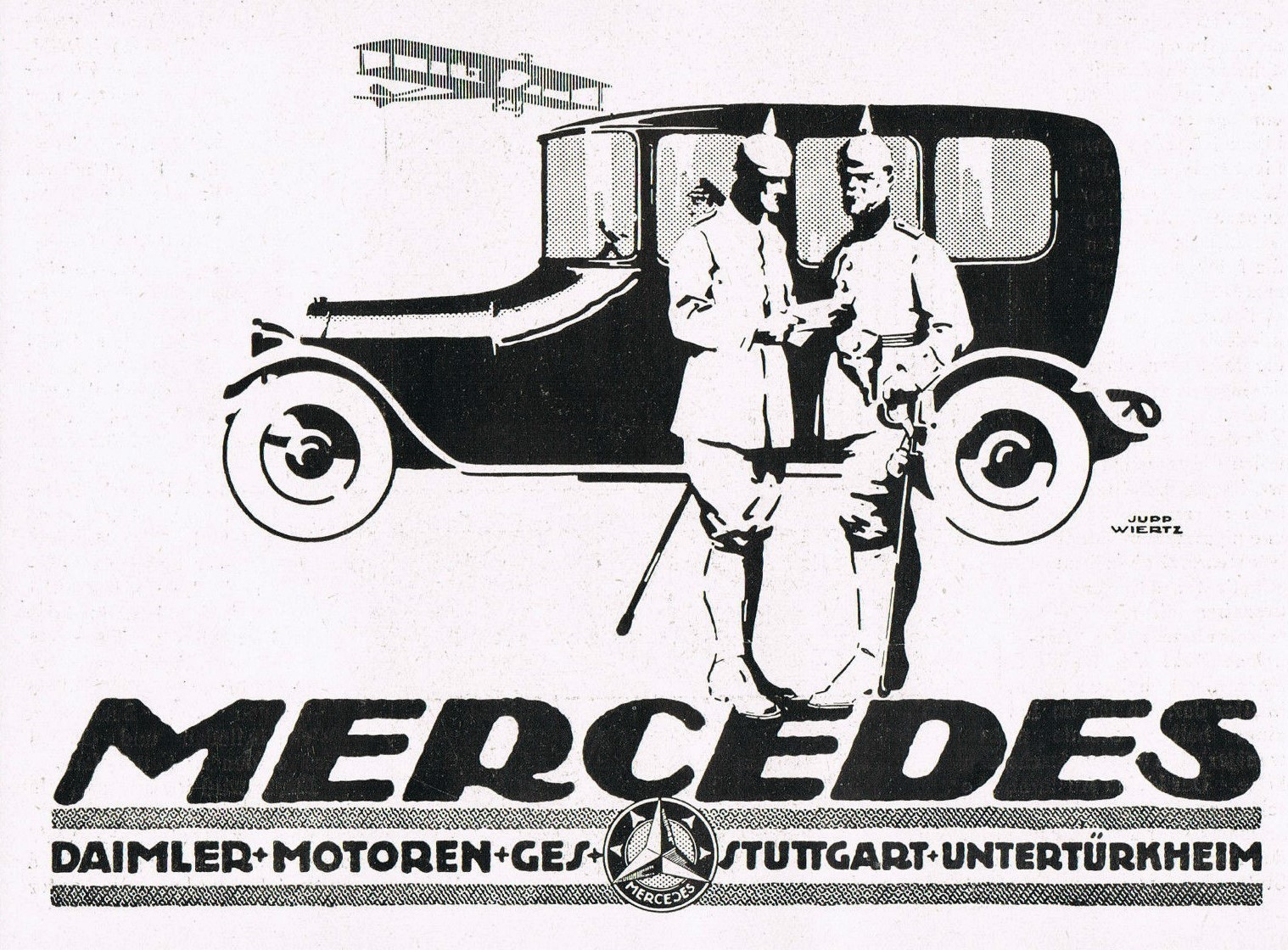
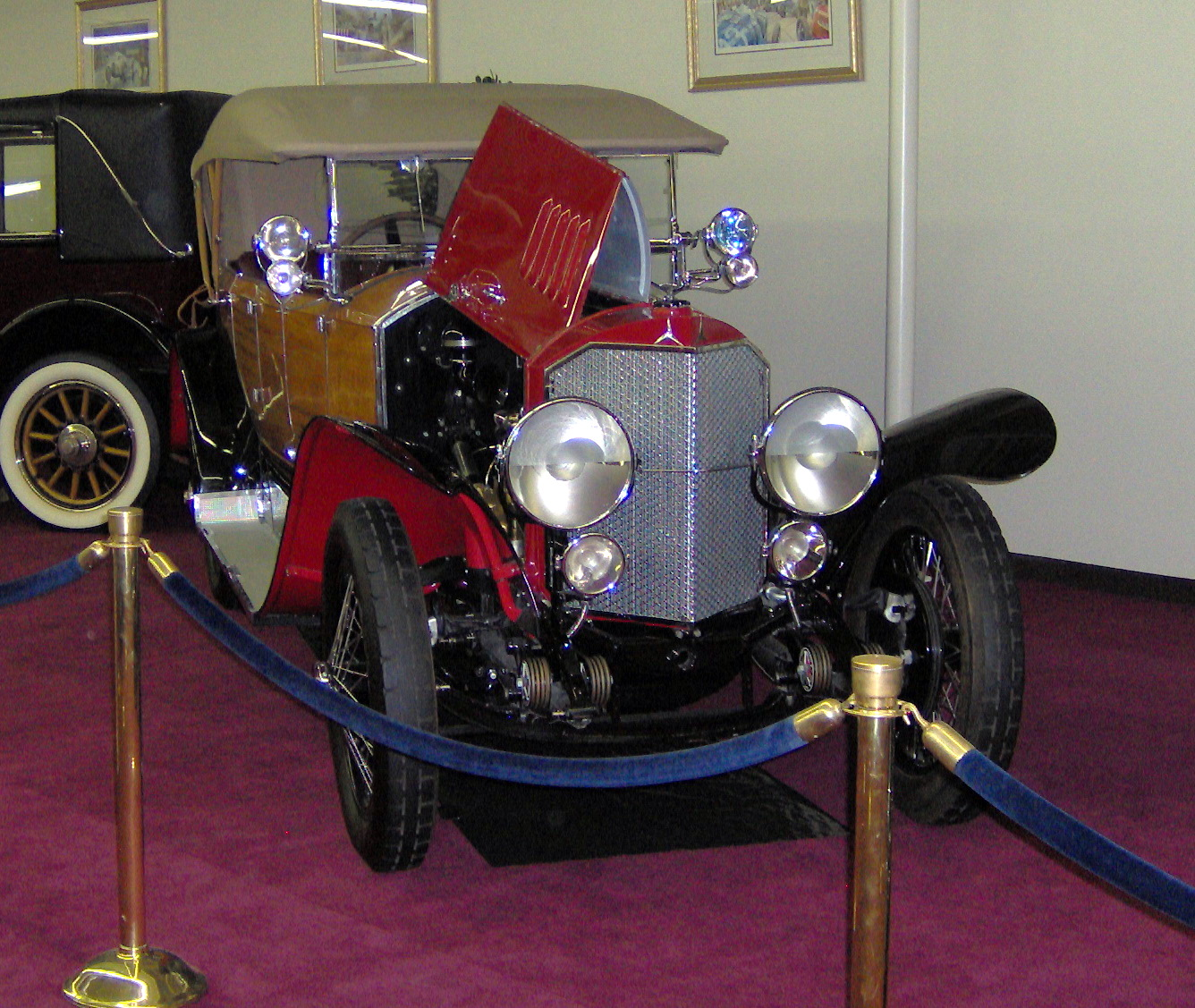
(Left): Mercedes car advertisement by Jupp Wiertz; (right): 1924 Mercedes 28/95 Wooden Skiff touring car. Note the three-pointed star ornament without the Mercedes-Benz circle

A new engine, developed for the model, would be called the Daimler-Mercedes engine, officially, which the DMG chairman accepted readily as it overcame the problem of the Daimler name in France being owned by Panhard & Levassor.

Over the next few months, Jellinek oversaw the development of the new car—at first by daily telegrams—and later by traveling to Stuttgart. He took delivery of the first one on 22 December 1900, at Nice's railway station—it had already been sold to the Baron Henri de Rothschild, who also had raced cars in Nice.

In 1901, the car amazed the automobile world. Jellinek again won the Nice races, easily beating his opponents in all the capacity classes and reaching 60 km/h (37 mph). The director of the French Automobile Club, Paul Meyan, stated: "We have entered the Mercedes era", a sentiment echoed by newspapers worldwide.

The records set by the new Mercedes 35 hp model amazed the entire automobile world. DMG's sales shot up, its Stuttgart plant was operating at full capacity, and it was consolidating its future as an automobile manufacturer—rather than merely an engine manufacturer who built some automobiles. The number of employees steadily increased from 340 in 1900 to 2,200 in 1904.

Mercedes was not lodged as a trade name for DMG automobile models until 23 June 1902, but soon the company decided to use the name as the trade name for its entire line of automobile models—and officially registered it on 26 September 1902.
