= Mercédès Jellinek =

Namesake of Mercedes-Benz

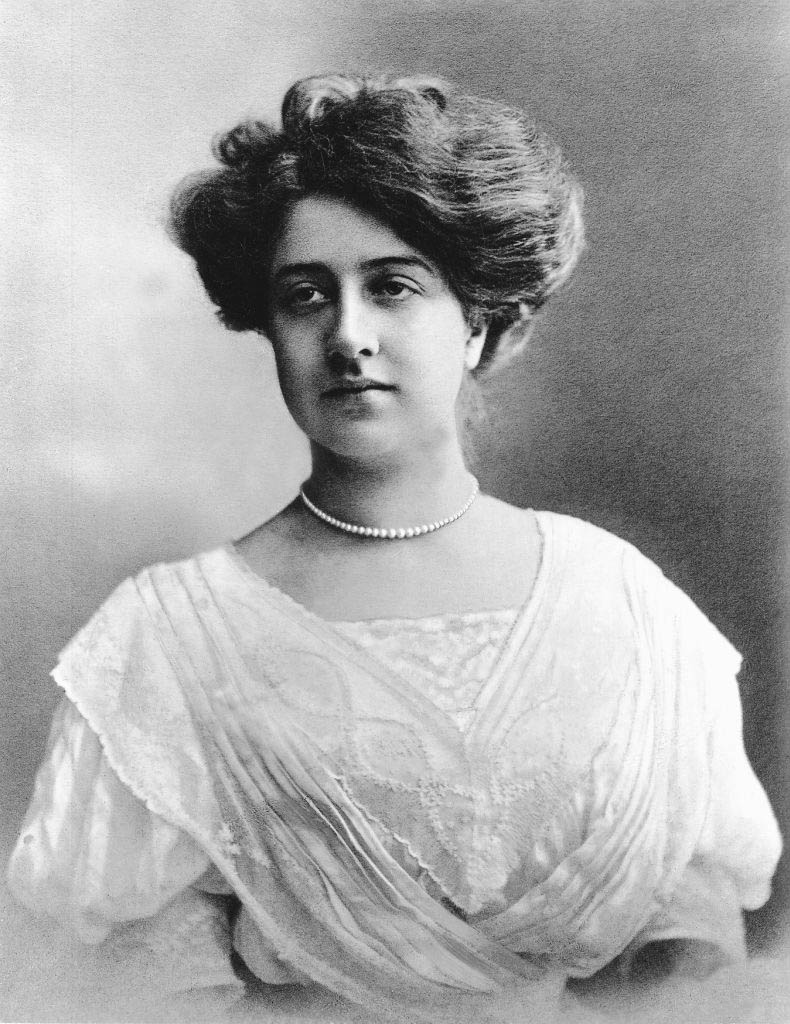
- Born: Adriana Manuela Ramona Jellinek; 16 September 1889; Vienna, Austria-Hungary
- Died: 23 February 1929 (aged 39); Vienna, Republic of Austria
- Other names: Mercédès; "Mercédès" Jellinek
- Occupation: Soprano
- Known for: Eponym of the Mercedes brand
- Father: Emil Jellinek

Mercédès Adrienne Ramona Manuela Jellinek (16 September 1889 – 23 February 1929) was the daughter of Austrian automobile entrepreneur Emil Jellinek and his first wife Rachel Goggmann Cenrobert. She was born in Vienna. She is best known for her father having Daimler-Motoren-Gesellschaft's line of Mercedes cars named after her, beginning with the Mercedes 35 hp model of 1901.

In addition, her father hung a large picture of her at the 1902 Paris Automobile exhibition. He even legally changed his name to Jellinek-Mercedes in 1903 after Daimler-Motoren-Gesellschaft registered Mercedes as a trademark in 1902. Mercedes is a Spanish female name meaning 'mercies' (Spanish: merced 'mercy', mercedes 'mercies').

== Biography ==
Jellinek lived in Vienna, and married twice. She had an elaborate wedding in 1909 in Nice, on the French Riviera, with Baron von Schlosser. They had three children; Karl (b.1910), Elfriede (married Gauss-Ghetaldi) (b. 1912) and Hans-Peter (b. 1916). The couple lived in Vienna until the end of the First World War. Baron von Schlosser was ruined financially after the collapse and dissolution of Austro-Hungarian Monarchy and during the political and economic instabilities of short-lived Republic of German-Austria (1918–1919). Mercédès was begging on the streets for food. She eventually divorced her husband and left her children to marry Baron Rudolf von Weigl, a talented, but poor, sculptor. She played music and had a good soprano voice. She never shared her father's passion for automobiles and never owned an automobile.

Jellinek died in Vienna, from bone cancer, in 1929, at the age of 39, and was buried at the Vienna Central Cemetery in the family grave near her grandfather, the former chief rabbi of Vienna, Adolf Jellinek. In 1926, Daimler merged with Benz & Cie; although the company traded as Daimler-Benz, it gave the name "Mercedes-Benz" to its cars to preserve the respected Mercedes brand.
