= Max Duttenhofer =

German entrepreneur and industrialist (1843-1903)

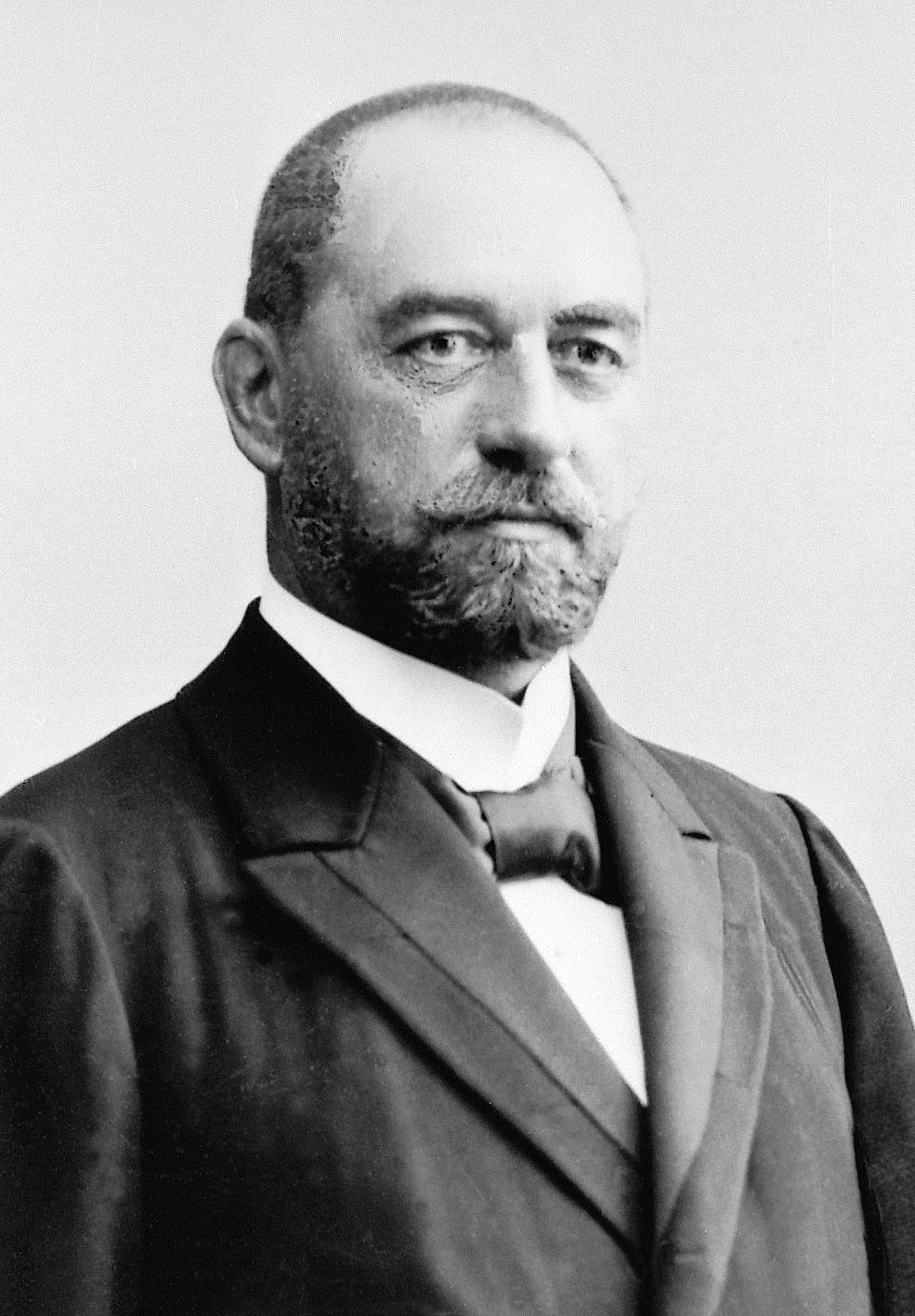
- Born: May 20, 1843; Rottweil, Germany
- Died: August 14, 1903 (aged 60); Tübingen, Germany
- Occupations: entrepreneur and industrialist

Max Duttenhofer (May 20, 1843 – August 14, 1903; full name: Max Wilhelm Heinrich Duttenhofer, 1896: Max von Duttenhofer) was a German entrepreneur and industrialist. His factory invented smokeless gunpowder.

== Life ==
In 1863 Max took over a powder mill from his father, from which the gunpowder factory Rottweil emerged. In 1884 he achieved a major breakthrough; smokeless gunpowder.

In 1890, Duttenhofer was one of the three founders of Daimler-Motoren-Gesellschaft. In 1898, he initiated the founding of a private military-industrial lab Zentralstelle für wissenschaftlich-technische Untersuchungen (Center for Scientific-Technical Research) in Neubabelsberg which later gave its name to centralite.

Duttenhofer was a member of the board of the Pan-German League.

He died of a heart attack in 1903.
