= Daimler Motoren Gesellschaft =

Defunct German manufacturer

Daimler-Motoren-Gesellschaft
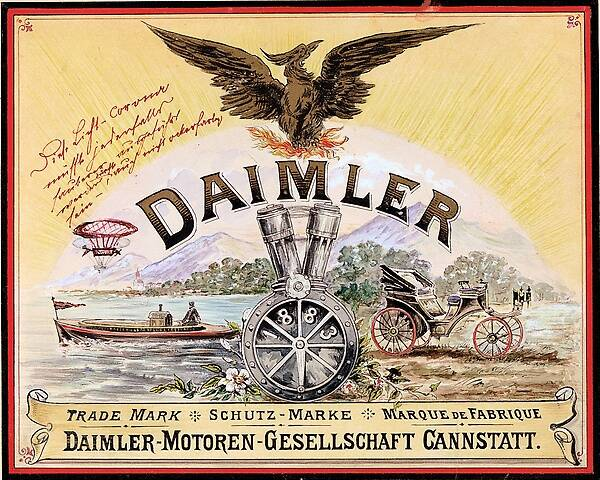
- Industry: Automotive
- Founded: 1890
- Founder: Gottlieb Daimler; Wilhelm Maybach
- Defunct: 1926; 100 years ago
- Fate: Merged with Benz & Cie
- Successor: Daimler-Benz (1926)
- Headquarters: Cannstatt, Stuttgart, Germany
- Products: Automobiles
- Brands: Mercedes

Daimler-Motoren-Gesellschaft (abbreviated as DMG, also known as Daimler Motors Corporation) was a German engineering company and later automobile manufacturer, in operation from 1890 until 1926. Founded by Gottlieb Daimler (1834–1900) and Wilhelm Maybach (1846–1929), it was based first in Cannstatt (today Bad Cannstatt, a city district of Stuttgart). Daimler died in 1900, and their business moved in 1903 to Stuttgart-Untertürkheim after the original factory was destroyed by fire, and again to Berlin in 1922. Other factories were located in Marienfelde (near Berlin) and Sindelfingen (next to Stuttgart).

The enterprise began to produce petrol engines but after the success of a small number of race cars built on contract by Wilhelm Maybach for Emil Jellinek, it began to produce the Mercedes model of 1902. After this automobile production expanded to become DMG's main product, and it built several models.

Because of the post World War I German economic crisis, in 1926 DMG merged with Benz & Cie., becoming Daimler-Benz and adopting Mercedes-Benz as its automobile trademark. A further merger occurred in 1998 with Chrysler Corporation to become DaimlerChrysler. The name was changed again to just Daimler AG in 2007 when Chrysler was sold. Most recently in 2022, the name was changed once more to the Mercedes-Benz Group.

== History ==
=== Daimler, Maybach, and DMG at Seelberg ===
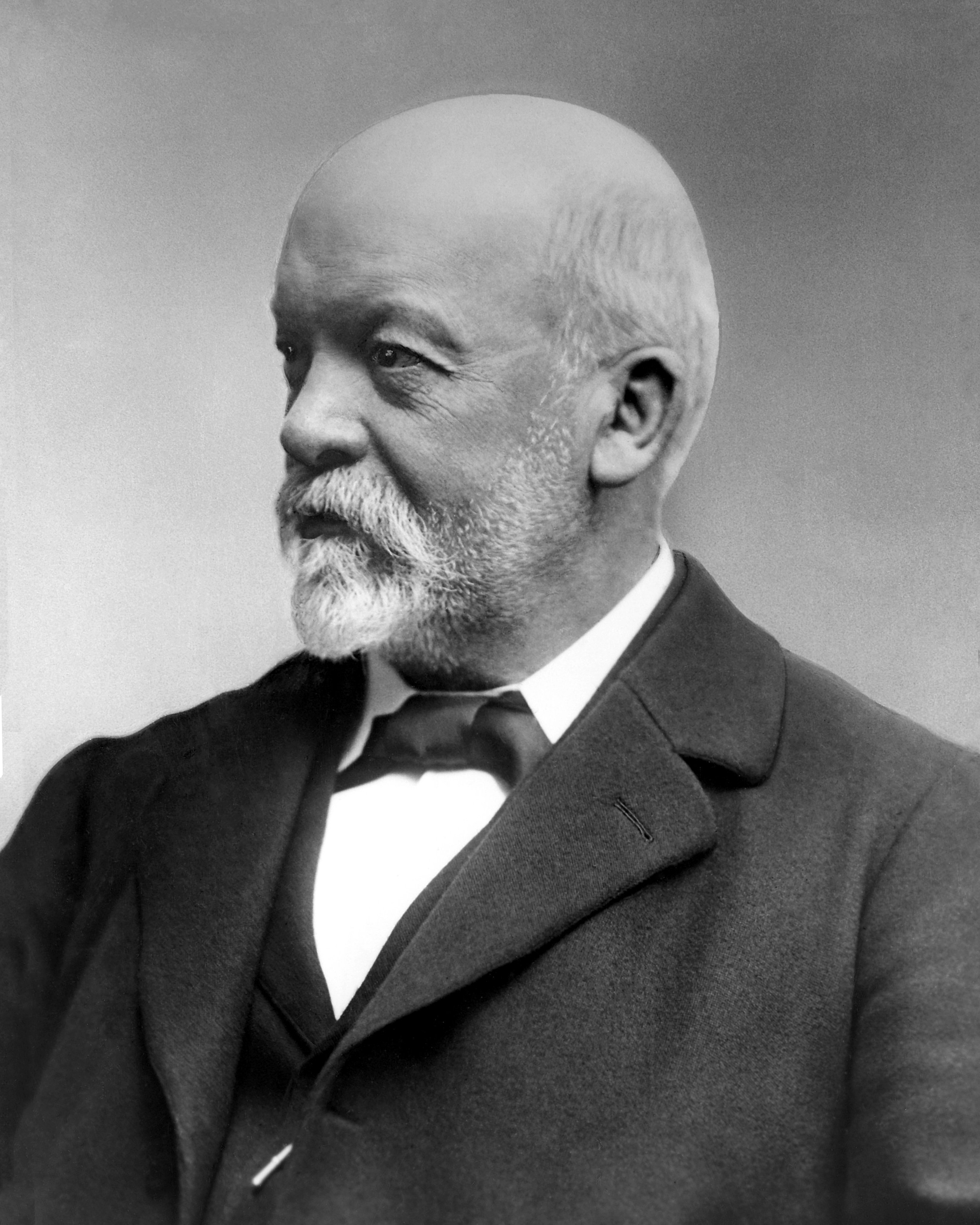
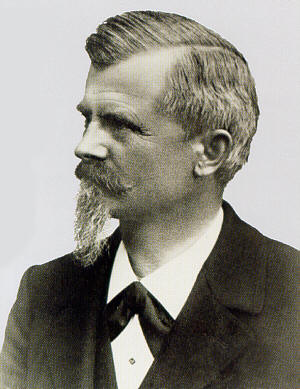
Gottlieb Daimler (left) and Wilhelm Maybach, founders

By 1882 both Daimler and Maybach had left Nikolaus Otto's Deutz AG Gasmotorenfabrik. In 1890 they founded their own engine business, Daimler Motoren Gesellschaft (DMG). Its purpose was the construction of small, high speed engines they had developed based on the same stationary engine technology.

DMG thus grew out of an extension of the independent businesses of Daimler and Maybach, who would revolutionize the world with their inventions for the automobile of a four-stroke petrol engine, carburetor, and so on. They would manufacture small internal combustion engines suitable for use on land, sea, and in the air (the basis for a symbol Daimler devised of a three pointed star, with each point indicating a different way).

On 5 July 1887 Daimler purchased a property in Seelberg Hill (Cannstatt) previously owned by Zeitler & Missel who had used it as a precious metal foundry. The site covered 2,903 square meters, cost 30,200 Goldmark, and from it they produced engines for their successful Neckar motorboat. They also sold licences for others to make their engine products and Seelberg became a centre of the rapidly growing automobile industry.

Daimler ran into financial problems because sales were not high enough and the licences didn't yield significant profit. An agreement was reached with industrialists Max Von Duttenhofer and Wilhelm Lorenz, both of whom were also munitions manufacturers, along with the influential banker Kilian von Steiner, who owned an investment bank, to convert the private business to a public corporation in 1890. (This agreement is regarded by some historians as a "devil's pact", as the inventors never got along with the new status.)

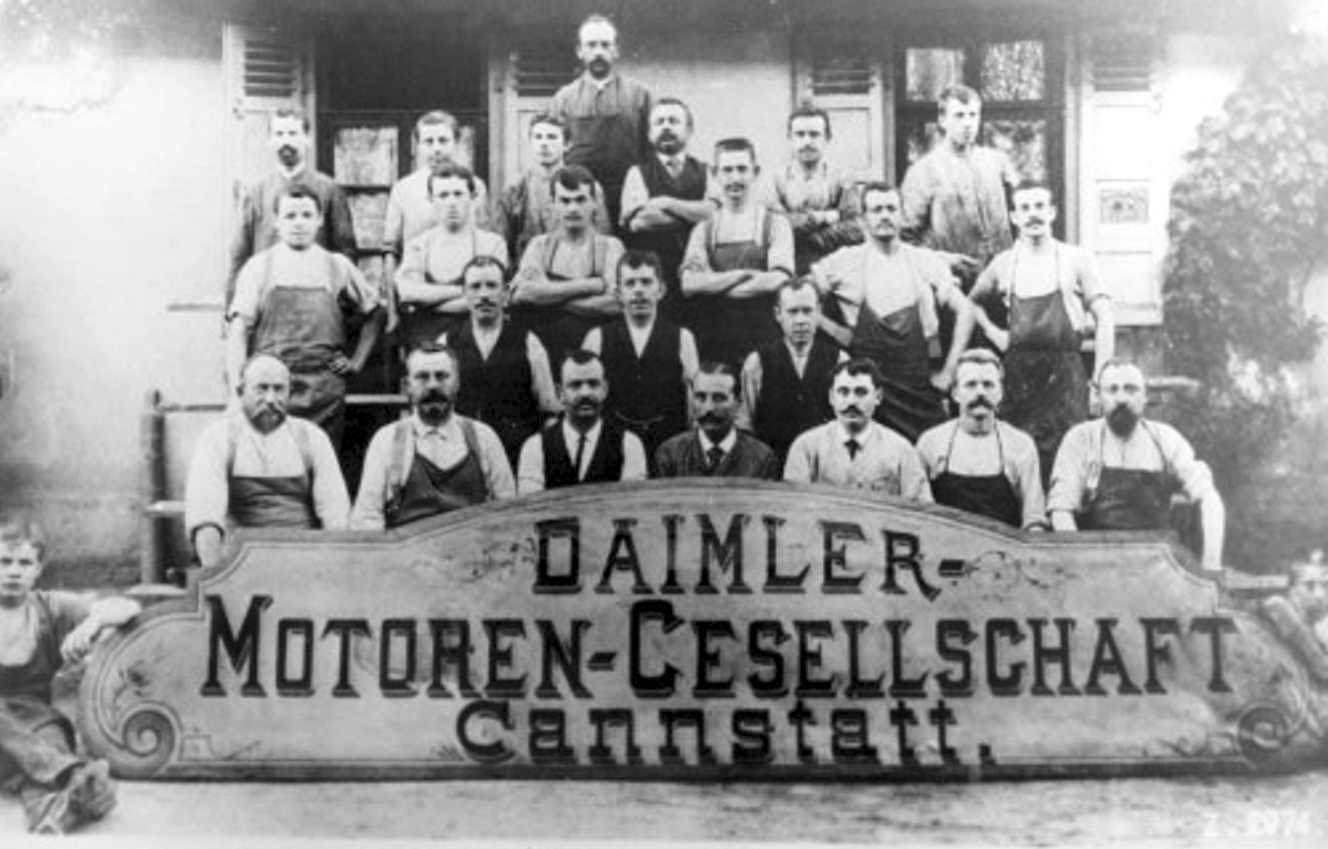
DMG employees in 1890

Not really believing in automobile production the financiers expanded the stationary engine business, as they were selling well, and even considered a merger with Otto's Deutz-AG. (During 1882, Gottflieb Daimler had serious personal problems with Nicholas Otto, when Daimler and Maybach worked for Otto.) Daimler and Maybach continued to advocate car manufacturing and as a result even left DMG for a short period. Daimler's friend, Frederick Simms, persuaded the financiers to take Gottflieb Daimler and Wilhelm Maybach back into faltering DMG in early 1896. Their business was re-merged with DMG's. Daimler was appointed General Inspector, Maybach chief Technical Director and Simms a director of DMG.

In 1892, Maybach designed the Phönix, an inline two-cylinder engine fitted with a new carburetor. Following the withdrawal of Gottlieb Daimler and Maybach to their own business to concentrate on cars, the enterprise had been close to a crisis but stabilised itself, selling mobile and stationary engines through a number of retailers around the world, from New York City to Moscow.

The first Daimler car, a singularly inelegant model, appeared in 1892, followed in 1895 by a two-cylinder vis á vis and, in 1897, DMG's first front-engined model, a Phönix-engined four-seat open tourer.

In 1900, Gottlieb Daimler died. Later DMG's successful Mercedes models based upon race cars designed by Wilhelm Maybach to the specifications of Emil Jellinek (who wanted a more modern and safer car, following the death of Willhelm Bauer in a Daimler racer) changed the board's outlook in favour of the automobile. Maybach continued as designer for a while, but quit in 1907 and was replaced by Gottlieb's son, Paul.

=== Expansion (1902 to 1920) ===
DMG's automobile sales took off, particularly with the first Daimler-Mercedes engine designed by Maybach placed into several race cars of 1900 built for Emil Jellinek. That race car was later referred to as the Mercedes 35 hp. Production capacity was extended to Untertürkheim. In 1902, DMG produce the first Mercedes models, led by the 60, the most famous early model, and officially adopted Mercedes as its automobile trademark; capable of 120 km/h (75 mph), the 60 combined touring and racing capacity, and was the top-status car to own (or for other makers, among them Berliet, Rochet-Schneier, Martini, Ariel, Star and FIAT, to copy; in the U.S., Daimler Manufacturing Company {Long Island City, New York} may have built one under licence in association with Steinway). In part due to the model 60's success, the number of DMG employees went from 821 (1903) to 2,200 (1904).

1906 to 1913 were further expansion years, with the creation of new capacity reducing the number of external suppliers. Increased mechanization took the annual productivity from 0.7 cars per worker, to 10. In 1911, shares of DMG were listed on the Stuttgart stock exchange.

=== Berlin-Marienfelde ===
On 2 October 1902 DMG opened a new works in the mountainous region to the south of Berlin. Its scope was initially limited to motorboat and marine engines. Later, it expanded into making trucks (1905) and fire trucks (1907). The region became a centre of the automobile industry, and other businesses moved in.

=== Untertürkheim ===
Untertürkheim was an ideal location to site a large factory as it was close to both the Neckar river and the Stuttgart–Ulm railway. The local Mayor Eduard Fiechtner sold the land (185,000 square meters) at a low price and also arranged for a railroad extension with its own station and energy from the Neckar's hydro-electric plant which had been built in 1900.

DMG had planned to open the facility in 1905 but the total destruction of Cannstatt's factory by fire in 1903 hastened the work and the new Art-Nouveau building, with a jagged-roof, was brought forward to start production in December 1903. The work force continued to grow.

On 17 May 1904 Unterturkheim became DMG's headquarters with the rest of the administration staff moving in on 29 May. In 1913, an additional 220,000 square meters were acquired and between 1915 and 1918 it was extended further. By the 1920s, Untertürkheim had almost all the production processes on one site from foundries to final car assembly. In 1925 the DMG design department also moved in.

=== The Cannstatt Fire (1903) ===
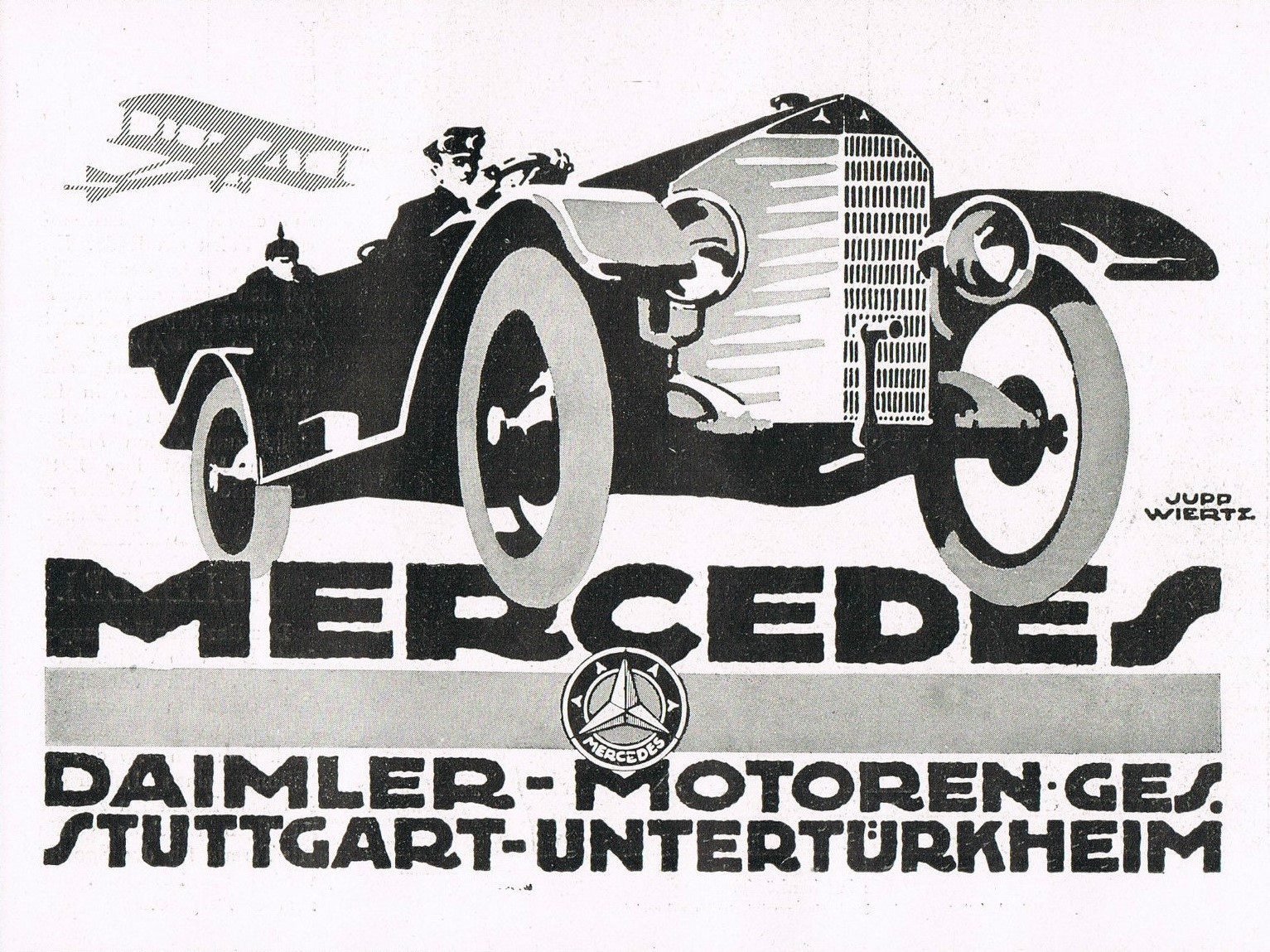
1916 DMG advertisement for the Mercedes automobiles, illustrated by Jupp Wiertz

On the night of 10 June 1903 the original Seelberg-Cannstatt plant suffered a great fire. All the machinery and 93 finished Mercedes cars, a quarter of the annual production, were destroyed, together with a small museum with historical items like Daimler-Maybach's first ever motorcycle, the Reitwagen.

The displaced workers received haven-salaries and additional bread rations. Neighboring businesses lent workshops, allowing production to continue. DMG created a Relief Fund (one of the first worker insurance schemes) and began building separator blocks in all its plants.

The following year, 1904, the whole operation moved to Untertürkheim. The last unit produced in Seelberg rolled out in the first weeks of 1905.

=== Sindelfingen ===
At the outbreak of the First World War, in 1914, there was a rush to produce war supplies. In the autumn of 1915, DMG opened the Sindelfingen factory for military vehicles, aircraft engines, and even entire aircraft. After the war, limited by the Versailles Treaty, it produced only automobile bodies.

== Motorboats ==
The production of motorboats by Daimler and Maybach began early, in 1886, with the Neckar (4.5 meters long with a speed of 11 km/h (6 knots)), the first in the world, and tested on the local Neckar river. That boat became DMG's first commercial hit, helped by the poor state of Germany's roads. Once the public corporation was formed, motorboat production became one of the new financiers' main interests and lead in 1902 to the building of the Berlin-Marienfelde factory specifically for their manufacture.

== Automobiles ==
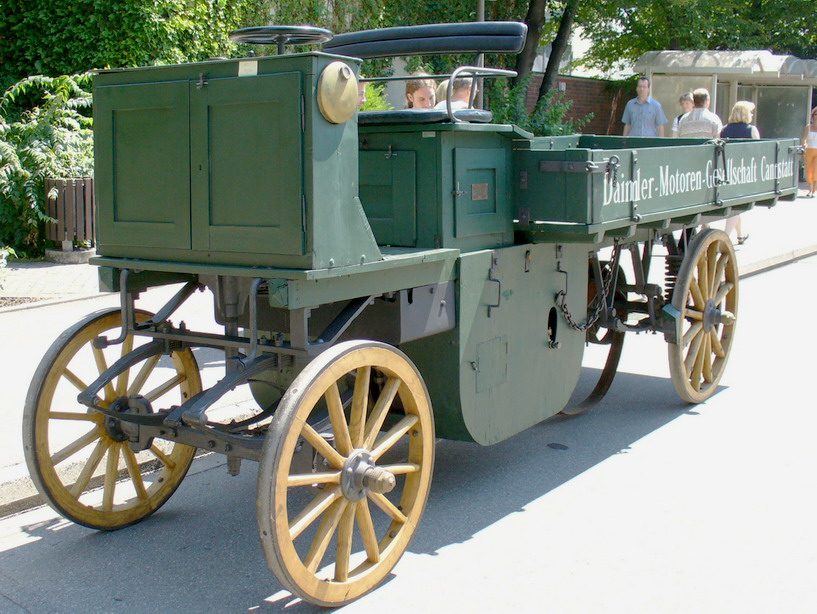
DMG truck (1898) with Phoenix engine

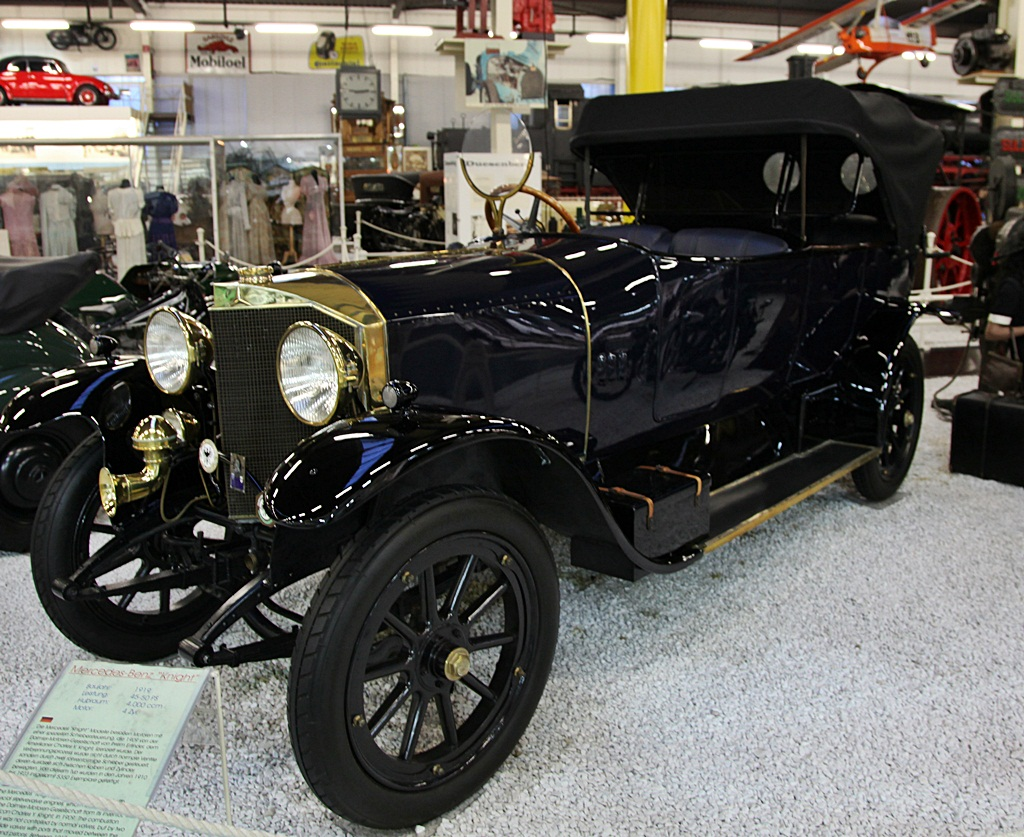
1912 Mercedes Knight 4.0 50Hp at Technikmuseum Sinsheim

Daimler had sold automobile-engine licences all over the world including to France, Austria, the UK, and the United States through an agreement with the piano-maker Steinway, in New York.

The first DMG automobile sale took place in August 1892 (its registration still survives) to the Sultan of Morocco.

Commercial vehicles had also been made mainly using a Phoenix engine, but up to 1900, when Daimler died, the bodies had not been standardised.

In 1902, the Mercedes car was built, compact and modern, with many improved features, a move which sparked the board's interest in automobile production. Mercedes then became DMG's main car brand name. There were some small exceptions: the Mercedes Simplex of 1902–1909, (the name indicating it being "easy to drive") and the Mercedes Knight of 1910–1924, featuring Coventry Daimler's development of Charles Yale Knight's sleeve-valve engine. All models were priced by their hp-rating.

The first truck, of 1.5 tons payload, was sold to London's British Motor Syndicate Ltd on 1 October 1896. Its rear-mounted Phoenix engine produced 4 hp (3 kW) at 700 rpm.

In 1897, the production of light commercial vehicles began. At that time they were popularly called business vehicles, and were very successful in the United Kingdom.

At the first Paris Motor Show, in 1898, a 5-ton truck was displayed, with a front-mounted engine.

=== Phoenix (1894) ===
In 1894, while working from temporary premises in the unused Hermann Hotel in Cannstatt, Gottlieb Daimler, his son Paul, and Wilhelm Maybach designed the Phoenix engine. It amazed the automobile world with:

- four cylinders placed vertical and parallel (a first for an automobile engine)
- camshaft-operated exhaust valves
- spray-nozzle carburetor (patented by Maybach in 1893)
- improvements in the belt-drive system.

Production of this engine which was put into cars, trucks, and boats became DMG's main product until the Mercedes car of 1902.

=== Mercedes (1900) ===
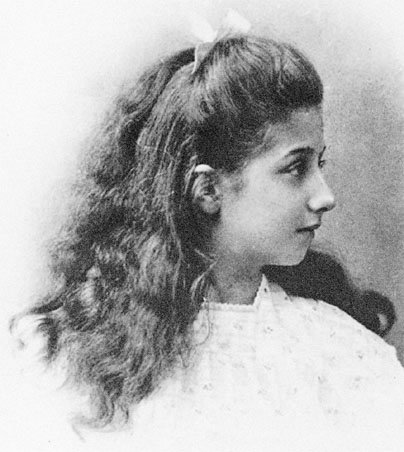
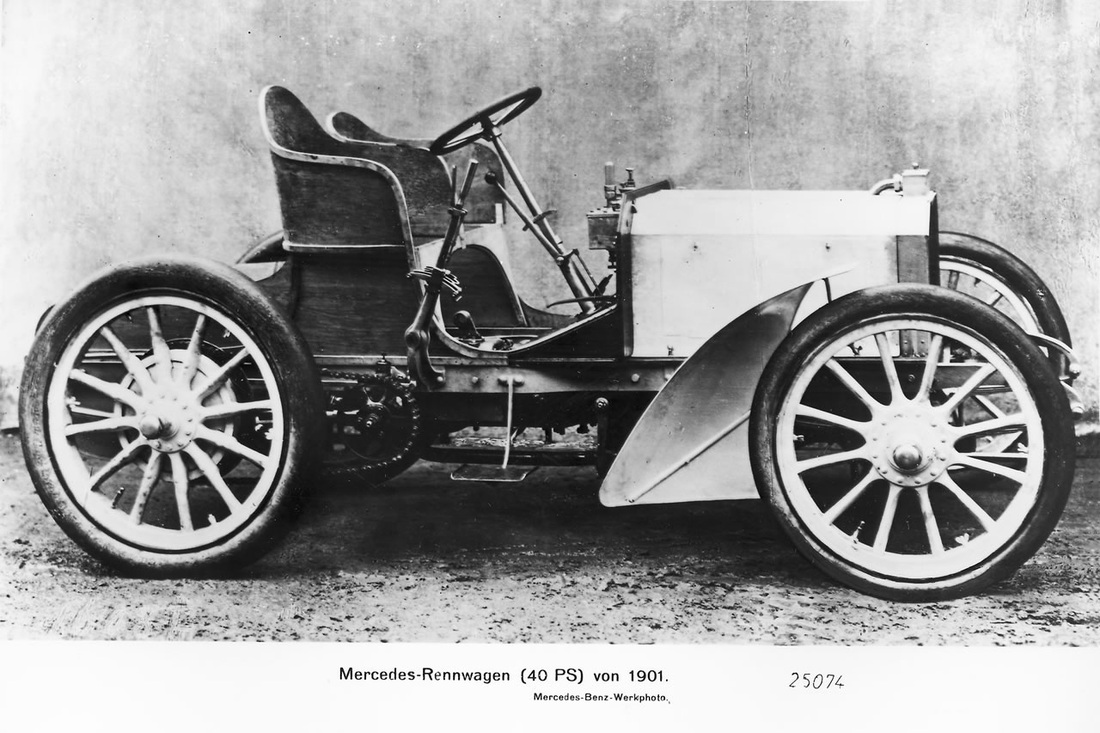
(Left): Mercédès, the daughter of Emil Jellinek, who had Daimler-Motoren-Gesellschaft's line of Mercedes cars named after her, beginning with the Mercedes 35 HP model of 1901 (pictured at right)

In 1902, an automobile that would later be called the Mercedes 35 hp was created by Maybach to the order of the successful Austrian merchant Emil Jellinek who became fascinated by both the Phoenix engine and race cars. The name was derived from an engine Maybach built to the specifications of Jellinek in 1900 that could achieve 35 hp (26 kW). Jellinek had stipulated that the engine be called Daimler-Mercedes and when it was successful, he stipulated a new model in an edition of vehicles that he would market and use personally. Later this was referred to as the Mercedes 35 hp (26 kW) model. It was never marketed by DMG until its success was seen to be substantial.

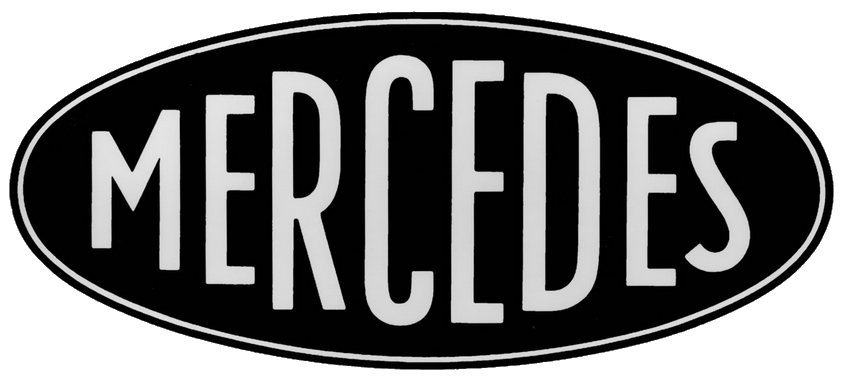
First logo of the 'Mercedes' brand by DMG, 1901

Jellinek competed as a driver, painting "Mercedes" (Spanish for godsend), on the automobiles he raced after his 10-year-old daughter. Jellinek's pursuit of higher speed brought him to Stuttgart personally, to Wilhelm Maybach's office where he also met with Paul Daimler, son of Gottlieb. Together they designed a new kind of automobile that would be "larger, wider, and with a lower center of gravity". A small number would be produced for Jellinek under contract. This was the first true automobile designed by DMG, as opposed to a coach with an engine fitted into it.

Blending the technical refinements of Maybach's new 4-cylinder engine, with a new chassis the automobile stunned the motorsport world of 1901. Jellinek had promised to purchase a large number of the race cars, (36 units for 550,000 Goldmark), if he could also be the sole concessionaire in Austria-Hungary, France, Belgium, and the US, using the name Daimler-Mercedes for the engine, and also become a member of the Board of Management.

In June 1902, after DMG realized that they had already conceded their Daimler trademark to Panhard & Levassor for the whole of France, they decided to name all their cars Mercedes after the engine and began to produce the Mercedes series. The great demand for the car soon had DMG operating at full-capacity.

=== Racing ===
In these early years, car races were used as advertising for their makers. Therefore, both DMG and Benz & Cie., their great rival, put the best of their cars on the track. Daimler cars were able to beat Benz until 1908, when a Benz achieved the land speed record, but in the following years, both brands were equal.

== First automobile multinational ==
DMG expanded with a subsidiary company in Austria

- Austro-Daimler

== International licences ==
=== French licences ===
Edouard Sarazin began early negotiations to license Gottlieb Daimler's engines in France. After his death, his wife finally succeeded, helped by Émile Levassor and René Panhard (then a timber-machinery manufacturers) selling their first engine in 1887.

Armand Peugeot, one of their clients, began fitting vehicles with Panhard & Levassor engines, and acquired Daimler's licence from them. Peugeot focused, successfully, on the German market.

Panhard & Levassor designed a complete automobile. Levassor mounted an engine (Daimler's) over the front axle, giving better balance and turning. Marketed in October 1891, it featured rear wheel drive by two side chains, pedal clutch, front radiator, and steering by lever.

Historians consider that the automobile was "a German invention, while France expanded it commercially", mainly by publicity from car-racing since in January 1886 Karl Benz was granted the first patent for an automobile he designed and built in 1885.

=== American licences ===
In 1888, Gottlieb Daimler established a cooperation with the German-born piano maker William Steinway in Astoria, Queens, later New York City, to build stationary and marine engines for gas and petroleum, and later on, in 1892, also to build cars as full copies of the German design. The engines and cars were produced in Steinway's premises at the "Rikers plant" opposite Rikers Island which was in use for piano production until nowadays. This business was sold after William Steinway died in 1896.

=== British licences, The Daimler Motor Company Limited ===
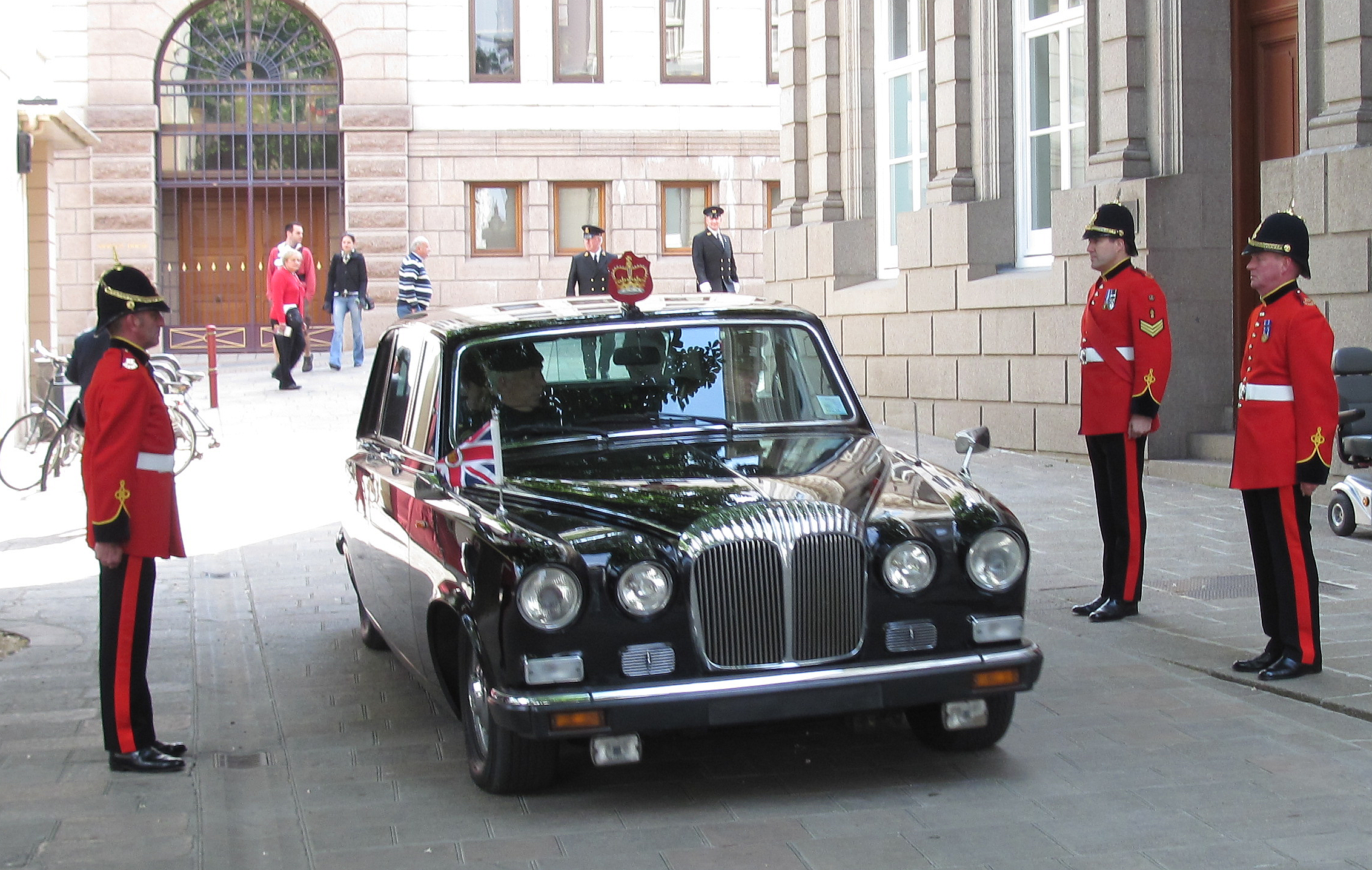
A Coventry Daimler: The DS420

In 1890 Hamburg-born Frederick Simms, a consulting engineer and a good personal friend of Gottlieb Daimler returned to the United Kingdom with the Phoenix engine for launches (though expressing thoughts for cars) having obtained from him British (and British Empire) rights to the Daimler patents. In 1893 Simms formed the Daimler Motor Syndicate Limited (DMS).

At the end of 1895 Simms received an offer from a London company promoter called Lawson of, at first, £35,000 to purchase all the Daimler rights. As part of the necessary arrangements, Maybach and Daimler having parted from DMG, Simms arranged to pay the now drifting DMG £17,100 on the condition that DMG took back Gottlieb Daimler. A 'contract of reassociation' was signed on 1 November 1895. The result was the divided Daimler-Maybach and DMG businesses then merged and were rejuvenated. In early 1896, having agreed with Daimler Motor Syndicate it would buy the Daimler rights, Lawson floated The Daimler Motor Company Limited (DMC) in London (with Gottlieb Daimler a director), the factory to be in a disused cotton mill in Coventry. Simms became a director of DMG (Cannstatt) but not DMC (London).

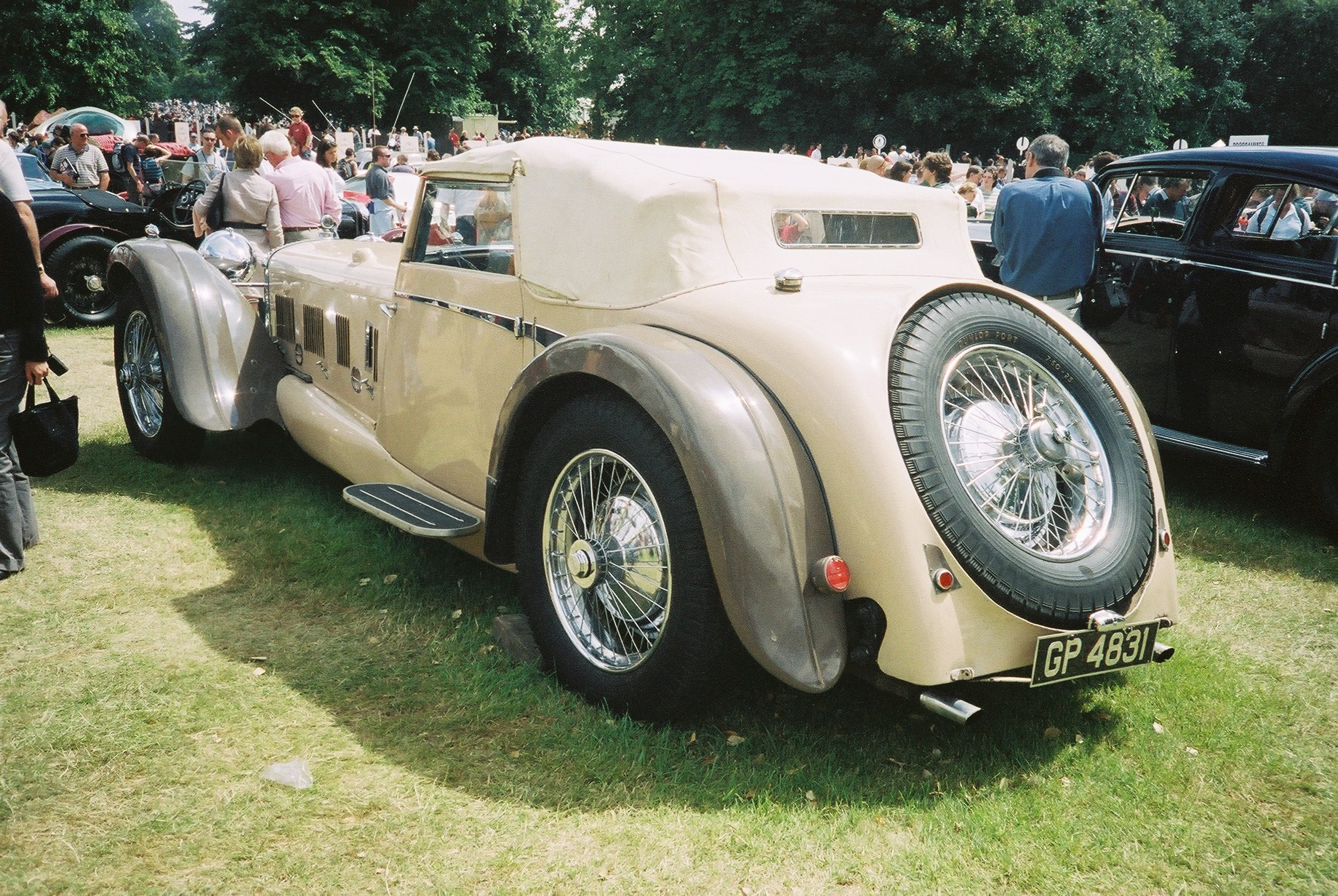
Daimler Double-Six 50 alloy V12 150 bhp (110 kW) Corsica drophead coupé body designed by Reid Railton (1931)

In 1910 Daimler Motor Company while retaining a separate identity, merged ownership with that of BSA (munitions), and began producing military vehicles. It also dropped the word motor from its name.

For over 65 years, The Daimler Company Limited produced a wide variety of premium quality vehicles including buses, ambulances, fire engines and some trucks but in particular medium-sized and large cars which were often very expensive. Their vehicles were distinguished by their finned exposed radiators, later by scalloped radiator shells. Until the early 1950s it was often said "the aristocracy buy Daimlers, the nouveau riche buy Rolls-Royce".

In 1960 the business was sold to Jaguar, which soon engaged in badge-engineering and often Jaguar and Daimler cars could only be distinguished by the grille and name badge. In 2005 the only Daimler models being produced were luxury models, such as the Daimler Super Eight.

The Daimler name moved with Jaguar into British Leyland, back to an independent Jaguar, and then into Ford. In July 2008 Tata Group, the current owners of Jaguar and Daimler, announced they were considering transforming Daimler into "a super-luxury marque to compete directly with Bentley and Rolls-Royce". An application to register the Daimler name by Jaguar as a trademark in the US was rejected in 2009.

== Airships and fixed-wing aircraft ==
Daimler built the engine for the first airship fuelled by petrol in 1888. From 1899 to 1907 DMG provided Maybach designed engines to Zeppelin. Wilhelm Maybach quit DMG in 1909. After 1909 Maybach and his son Karl founded their own enterprise in Württemberg and took over supplying the engines.

During the First World War, from 1915 the Sindelfingen factory produced large numbers of winged aircraft and aircraft engines. Production was prohibited after the conflict under conditions laid down by the Treaty of Versailles.

=== Aircraft ===
- Daimler D.I
- Daimler G.I
- Daimler L11
- Daimler L14

== Three-pointed star: land, water and air ==
In the 1870s, while working for Otto at Deutz AG Gasmotorenfabrik in Cologne, Daimler sent his wife Emma Kunz a postcard, marking his residence with a three-pointed star and writing: "one day this star will shine over our triumphant factories". Since then, this line has inspired both Daimler and Maybach when developing light and powerful engines for "land, water, and air".

In the 1900s, after the Mercedes' success, DMG was still lacking a trademark. Paul and Adolf Daimler, the sons of Gottlieb (who had died in early March 1900), suggested using that symbol. Daimler Motoren Gesellschaft's board accepted the proposal in June 1909, also registering a four-pointed one. The four-pointed star became the emblem of Deutsche Aerospace AG (DASA) in the 1980s and then the logo of the European Aeronautic Defence and Space Company (EADS).

The three-pointed star debuted in 1910. In 1916, it was surrounded by a circle with four additional stars, with either the name Mercedes or of the respective factory (Untertürkheim or Berlin-Marienfelde). In 1937, the familiar symbol was registered by Daimler-Benz, a three-dimensional three-pointed star, contained in a circle.

== German crisis (1920s) ==
DMG was one of the most important German businesses at the time of the German crisis; tripling its capital to 100 million shares in 1920, and moving its headquarters to Berlin in 1922.

After the war the German automobile industry stagnated because of insufficient demand and because automobiles were taxed by the government as luxury items. The country also was hit by a petrol shortage.

In 1923, DMG production fell to 1,020 units, compared to Benz & Cie. making 1,382 in Mannheim. The average cost of a car was 25 million marks. Strike action and inflation pushed DMG to the limit. To survive DMG produced Mercedes bicycles and typewriters, and it even issued its own emergency money.

== Daimler-Benz and the Mercedes-Benz brand (1926) ==
For the two separate businesses to survive the financial problems of the day, in 1919, Benz & Cie. proposed a merger, but DMG formally rejected it in December. Then, as the German crisis worsened, the struggling firms met again in 1924 and signed an Agreement of Mutual Interest, valid until the year 2000. They standardized design, production, purchasing, sales, and advertising—marketing their car models jointly—although keeping their respective brands.

On 28 June 1926 DMG and Benz & Cie. merged into Daimler-Benz AG, establishing its headquarters in the Untertürkheim factory.

Unable to use Daimler on all their products their automobiles were branded Mercedes Benz in honour of DMG's most successful car model and the last name of Karl Benz. Its new trademark consisted of a three-pointed star surrounded by the traditional laurels of Karl Benz's logo and labelled Mercedes Benz. The next year, 1927, the number of units sold tripled to 7,918, and diesel truck production was launched.

== Trivia ==
- In 1890, DMG was delivering stationary and marine engines to Russia. In 1910, it opened its first dealership in Moscow. From 1912, it was a purveyor to the Russian Royal Court. Even after the war and the socialist revolution, the Mercedes won most of the great show competitions it entered in Russia.
- In 1892, DMG designated Otto Speidel as its Munich representative.
- In 1896, Bavarian Engine & Automobile also began to sell their products, naming Karl Moll as representative in 1898.
- In 1910, it opened a shop for trucks, buses and motorboats in Hiltenspergerstrasse 21.
- In 1914, in Paris, one of the greatest races in history took place, with 37 cars of six manufacturers from six countries. To beat the favorite Peugeot team, DMG used an aircraft engine designed by Paul Daimler and Fritz Nallinger. It was built by the automobile department but tested by the airship department. The cars produced 105 hp (78 kW) at 3100 rpm (no Mercedes had exceeded 1,500 rpm before then). It had four steel cylinders (M93654), and sixteen valves, an aluminum crankcase, crankshafts of special Austrian steel, a single camshaft, and displaced 4,483 cc.
- In 1921, DMG presented the supercharged Mercedes Kompressormotor, successful in both the private market and on the race track.

== See also ==
- List of Mercedes-Benz vehicles

== Sources ==
- Daimler-Motoren-Gesellschaft (1915). DMG 1890-1915: Zum 25-jähren Bestehen der Daimler-Motoren-Gesellschaft, Untertürkheim, 28. November 1915 [DMG 1890-1915: For the 25th anniversary of the Daimler-Motoren-Gesellschaft, Untertürkheim, 28 November 1915] (in German). Berlin: G. Braunbeck. OCLC 11018934.
- ————————————— (1923). 40 Jahre Daimler-Motoren: ein Beitrag zur Geschichte des Automobils [40 years of Daimler-Motors: A contribution to the history of the automobile] (in German). Stuttgart: Strecker und Schröder. OCLC 39899964.
- Wise, David Burgess. "Daimler: Founder of the Four-Wheeler", in Northey, Tom, ed. World of Automobiles, Volume 5, pp. 481–483. London: Orbis, 1974.
