= Maybach (disambiguation) =

Maybach is a brand, marque, and division, of Daimler AG (Daimler-Benz; Mercedes Benz).

Maybach may also refer to:

== People ==
=== Surname ===
- Albert von Maybach (1822–1904), German politician
- Christiane Maybach (1932–2006), German actress
- Karl Maybach, son of Wilhelm Maybach, and co-founder of Maybach-Motorenbau
- Ulrich Schmid-Maybach, philanthropist who founded the Maybach Foundation
- Wilhelm Maybach (1846–1929), German internal combustion engineer and industrialist, founder of Maybach-Motorenbau

=== Stage name ===
- Maybach Blue Justice (born 1968 as Yuji Nagata (Japanese: 永田 裕志)), Japanese pro-wrestler
- Maybach Don (born 1967 as Manabu Nakanishi (Japanese: 中西 学)), Japanese pro-wrestler
- Maybach Suwa Jr. (born 1984 as Hajime Ohara (Japanese: 大原 甫)), Japanese pro-wrestler
- Maybach Taniguchi (Japanese: マイバッハ谷口; born 1976 as Shuhei Taniguchi Japanese: 谷口 周平), Japanese pro-wrestler
- Maybach Taniguchi, Jr. (born 1975 as Takahiro Suwa Japanese: 諏訪 高広), Japanese pro-wrestler

== Organizations ==
- Maybach Foundation, a 501(c)(3) non-profit
- Maybach Music Group, a U.S. record label founded by Rick Ross
- Museum for Historical Maybach Vehicles, Neumarkt in der Oberpfalz, Bavaria, Germany; an automobile museum
- MTU Friedrichshafen, a company spun-off from Daimler's Maybach-Motorenbau GmbH which manufactures what were Maybach engines

== Vehicles and transportation ==
- Maybach double-differential, a type of steering setup
- LaS Maybach (Sd.Kfz.101), Panzerkampfwagen I Ausf.B — WWII Nazi German light tank
- Zmaj Fizir-Maybach, a Fizir F1V produced under license by Zmaj using Maybach engines; a Yugoslavian biplane
- Maybach Specials, a series of Australian built racing cars from the 1950s; see Australian Drivers' Championship § History

== Other uses ==
- Maybach I and II, Wunsdorf, Germany; WWII bunkers for Nazi military high command
- "Maybach", a 2008 song by The Yellow Moon Band
- "Maybach" (song), a 2021 song by 42 Dugg

== See also ==
- Maybach Music (disambiguation)
- List of WWII Maybach engines
