= Mercedes-Benz S-Class (W223) =

Seventh generation of Mercedes-Benz S-Class

Mercedes-Benz S (W223)
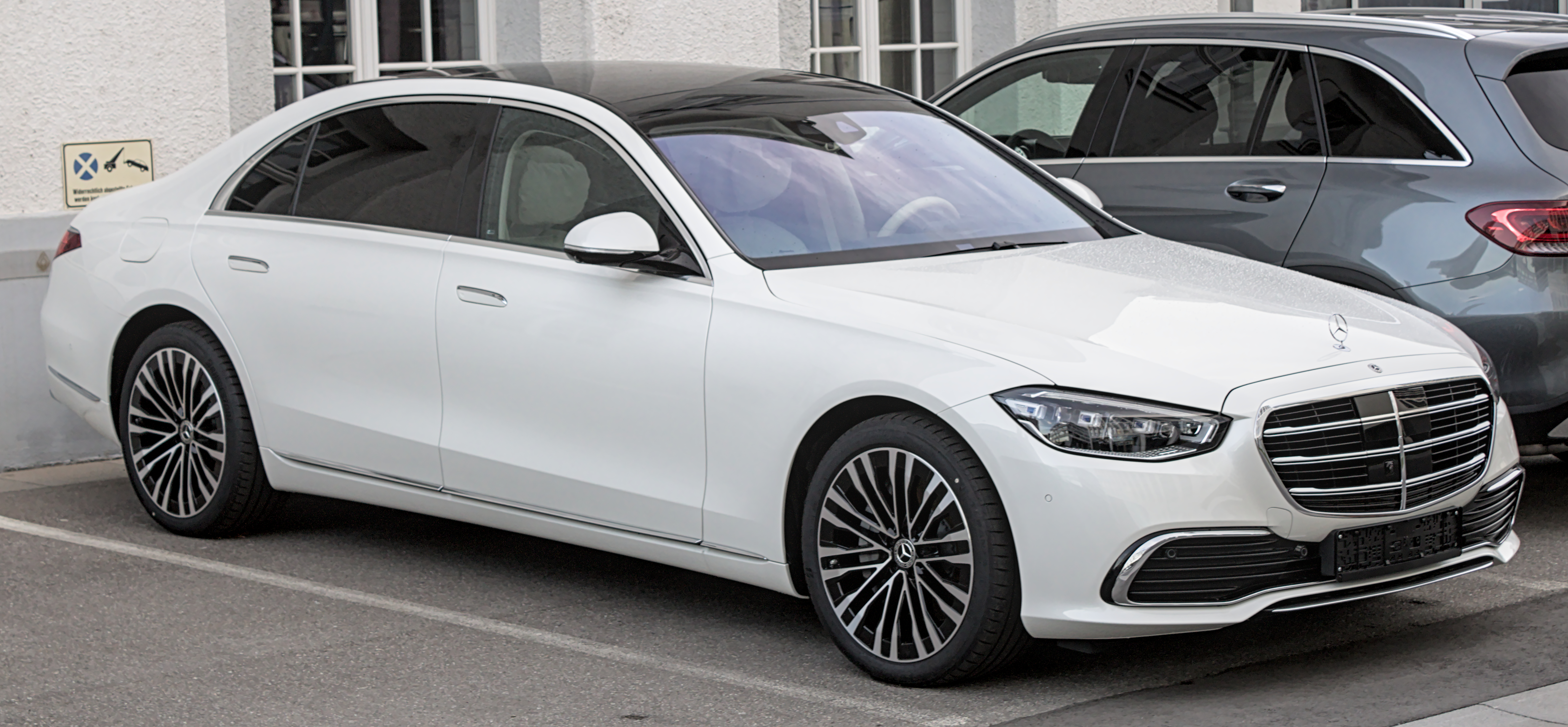

Overview
- Manufacturer: Daimler AG (2020–2022); Mercedes-Benz Group (2022–present)
- Production: September 2020–present
- Model years: 2021–present
- Assembly: Germany: Sindelfingen; India: Pune (MBI); Indonesia: Bogor (MBI); Malaysia: Pekan (HICOM); Thailand: Samut Prakan (TAAP)
- Designer: Balázs Filczer

Body and chassis
- Class: Full-size luxury car (F)
- Body style: 4-door saloon
- Layout: Front-engine, rear-wheel-drive or all-wheel-drive (4MATIC)
- Platform: Mercedes-Benz MRA Large
- Related: Mercedes-Benz C-Class (W206)

Powertrain
- Engine: Petrol: 2.5 L M256 turbo I6 (China); 3.0 L M256 turbo I6; 4.0 L M176 twin-turbo V8; 6.0 L M279 twin-turbo V12; Petrol plug-in hybrid: 3.0 L M256 turbo I6; 4.0 L M176 twin-turbo V8; 4.0 L M177 twin-turbo V8; Diesel: 2.9 L OM656 turbo I6
- Electric motor: 48 V electrical system (EQ Boost); Schaeffler PSM P2 Hybrid Module High Voltage gearbox-mounted electric motor (PHEV); 140 kW (188 hp) synchronous electric motor (63 S E Performance)
- Transmission: 9-speed 9G-Tronic/9G-Tronic plug-in-hybrid automatic
- Hybrid drivetrain: Mild hybrid (EQ Boost); Plug-in hybrid
- Battery: Up to 29 kWh high-voltage lithium ion
- Electric range: 100 km (62 mi)

Dimensions
- Wheelbase: 3,106 mm (122.3 in) (W223); 3,216 mm (126.6 in) (V223); 3,396 mm (133.7 in) (Z223)
- Length: 5,179 mm (203.9 in) (W223); 5,289 mm (208.2 in) (V223); 5,460 mm (215.0 in) (Z223)
- Width: 1,954 mm (76.9 in)
- Height: 1,503 mm (59.2 in)
- Curb weight: 1,995–2,350 kg (4,400–5,180 lb)

Chronology
- Predecessor: Mercedes-Benz S-Class (W222)

The Mercedes-Benz W223 is the seventh generation of the S‑Class full-size luxury saloon, produced by Mercedes-Benz since 2020. It replaces the W222 S‑Class which had been produced since 2013.

== Design ==
The W223 S-Class is based on the second-generation Modular Rear Architecture (MRA) platform and uses a four-link front suspension and multi-link independent rear suspension. Air suspension is standard and can automatically lower by 20 mm (0.79 in) at 160 km/h (99 mph) to increase stability.

Compared to the previous generation W222 S-Class, rear headroom has increased by 16 mm (0.63 in) and rear legroom has increased by 41 mm (1.6 in). Boot capacity has increased by 20 litres (0.71 cu ft) to 550 litres (19 cu ft). The W223 directs heat from the engine to the wheel arches and underbody to improve airflow and has a drag coefficient of 0.22.

At the launch, Mercedes-Benz announced that its V12 engine would be exclusive to Mercedes-Maybach S 680 4MATIC and that no coupé or convertible version of S-Class would be produced. At IAA 2021 in Munich, Mercedes-Benz revised its position to add the V12 engine to the Mercedes-Benz S-Class, S 680 Guard 4MATIC, ending the Mercedes-Maybach's exclusive use of V12 engine.

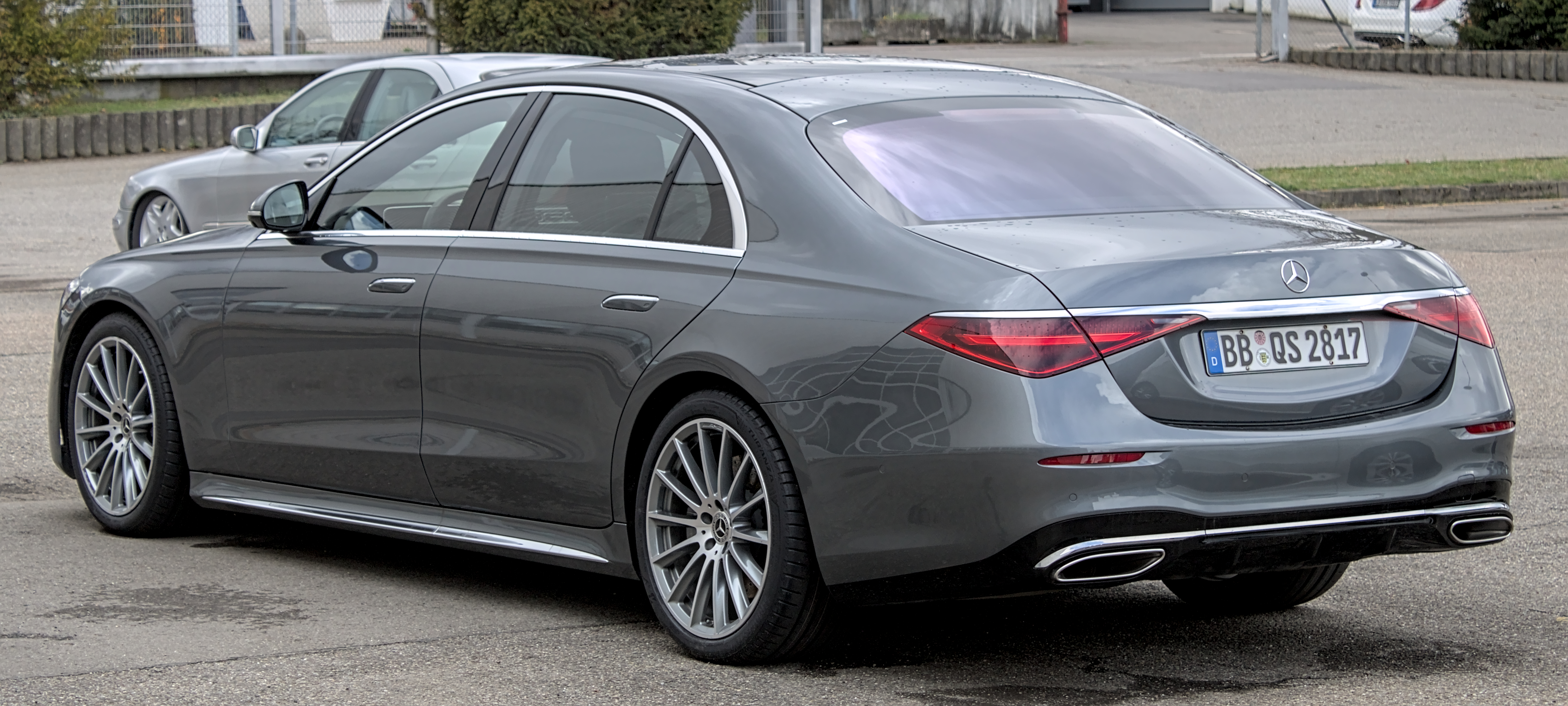
Rear view

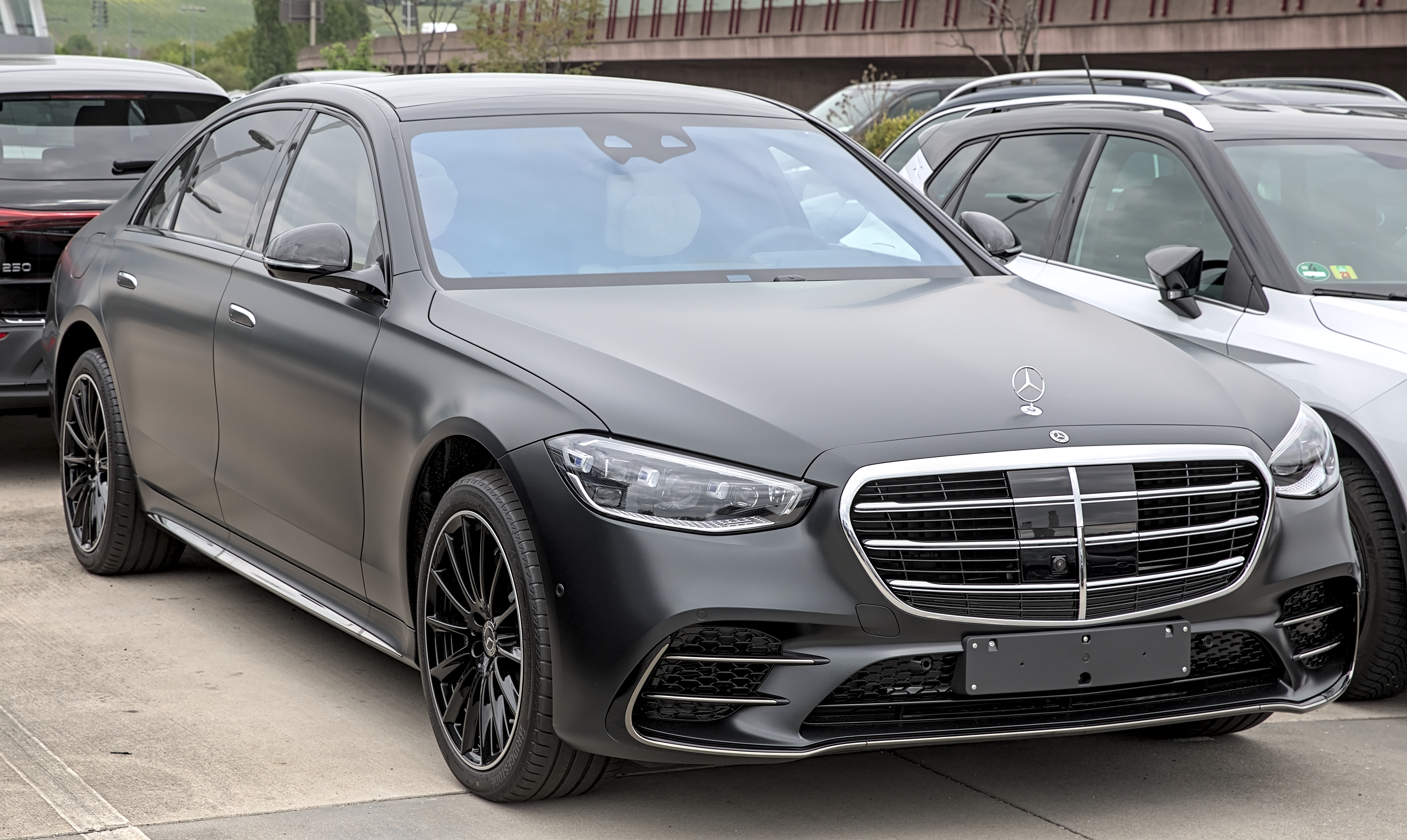
Mercedes-Benz S 580 AMG Line (W223, SWB)

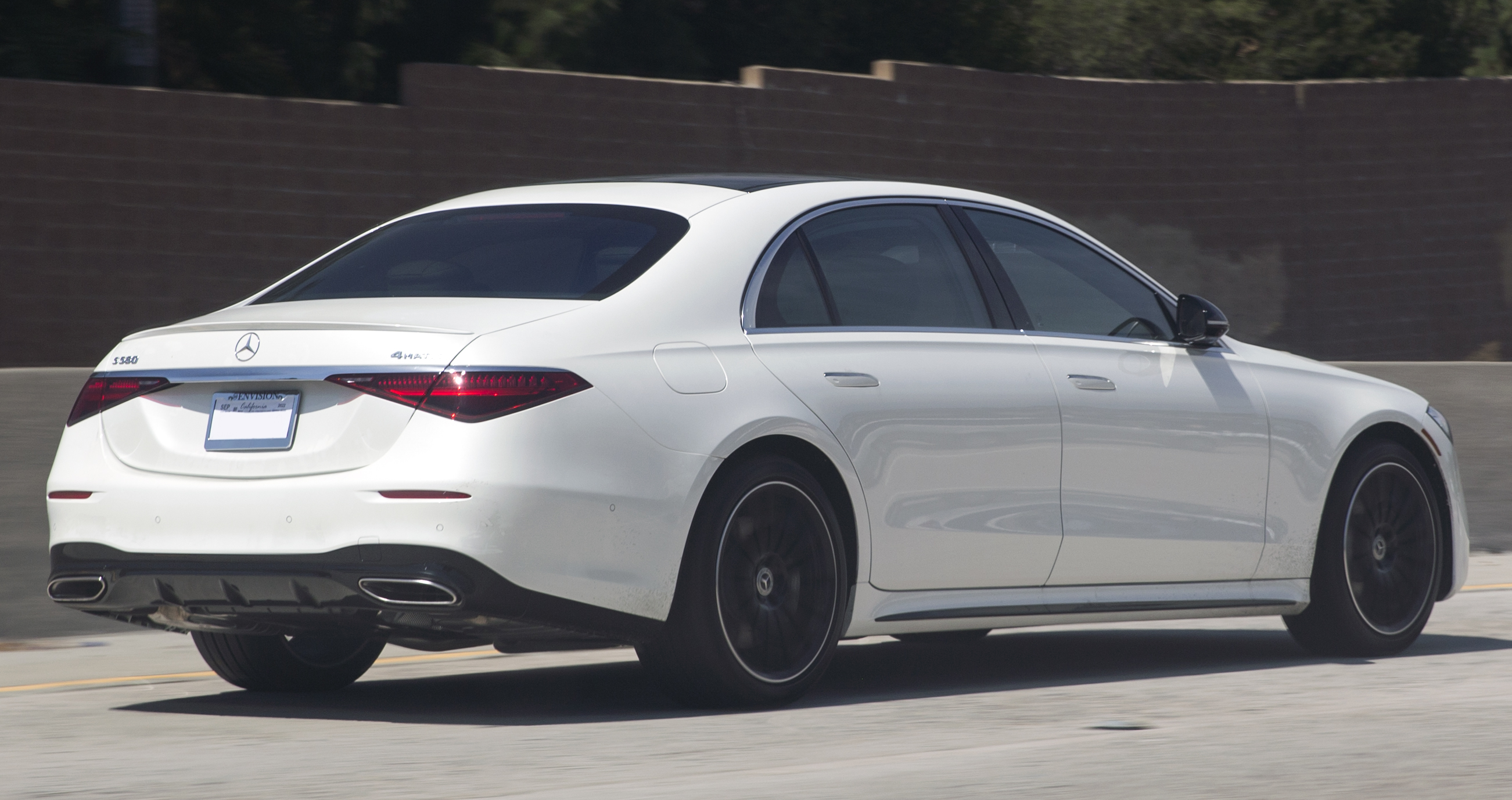
Mercedes-Benz S 580 AMG Line (V223, LWB)

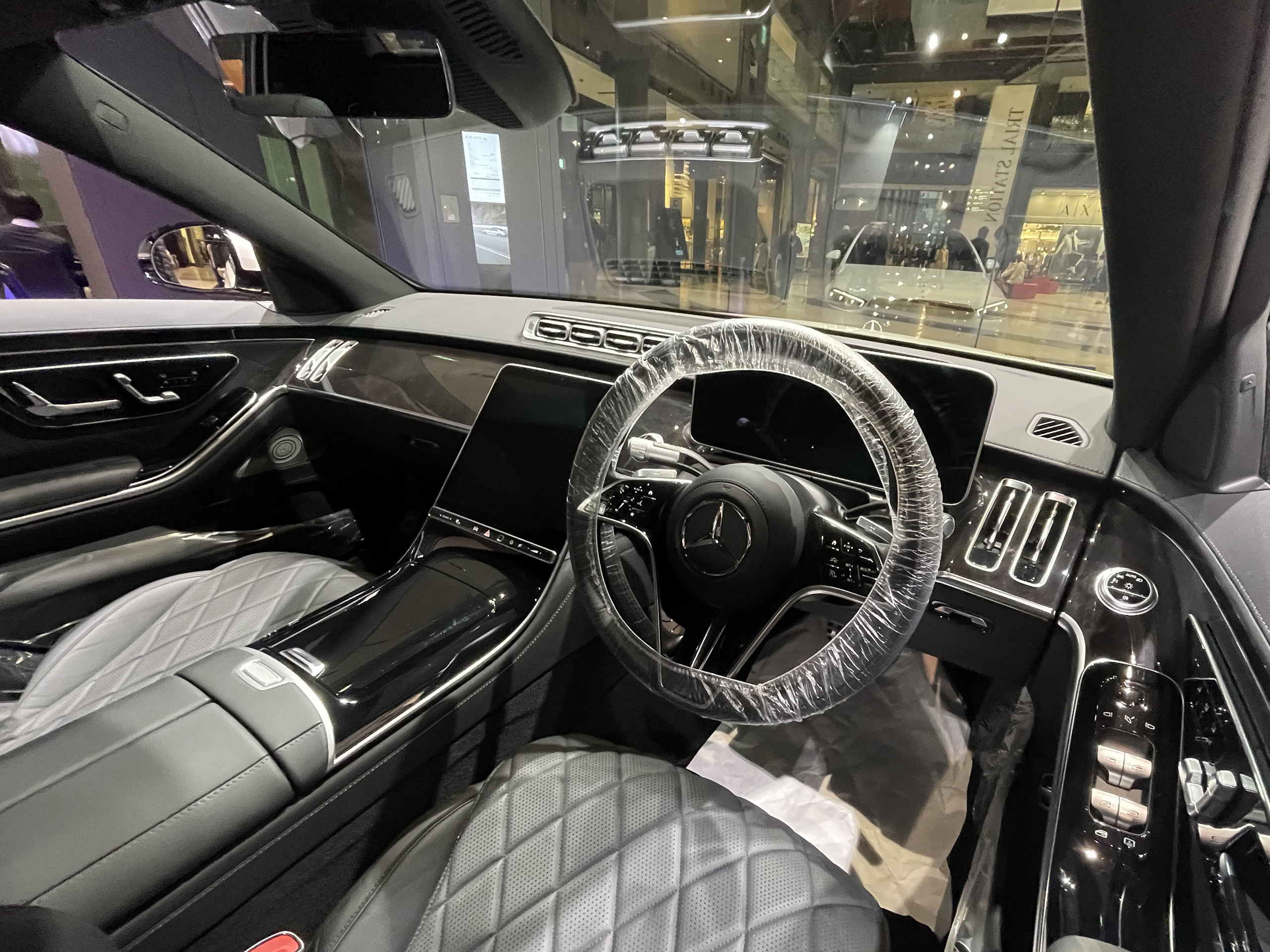
Interior (steering wheel is packed)

== Equipment ==
The W223 uses the second-generation Mercedes Benz User Experience (MBUX) infotainment system. It features a 12.3-inch instrument cluster and a 12.8-inch OLED centre infotainment system with haptic feedback. The MBUX system features over-the-air software update support, automatic driver profile selection via voice or fingerprint recognition, and a virtual assistant which activates by saying "Hey Mercedes". The assistant can be controlled by the rear seat passengers and can also control smart home appliances. The car can automatically close the windows and sunroof and recirculate air as it approaches a tunnel or detects poor air quality. Interior cameras can detect driver movements as to automatically lower the rear sunblinds if the driver looks back or switch on the interior light if the driver reaches towards the glovebox. The cameras can detect if a child seat has been installed but the seat belt has not been buckled. The car features 22 cameras and radar sensors for the adaptive cruise control, automatic steering, lane departure warning, emergency braking, and traffic sign recognition. Radar sensors can predict oncoming side collisions and raise the suspension by 8 cm (3.1 in) to direct the crash force towards the doorsills. A SAE Level 3 semi-autonomous driving system is available in Germany since the second half of 2021.

Optional equipment includes rear-axle steering, rear-seat airbags, and a head-up-display with augmented reality for navigation directions. The headlights can project symbols on the road to warn the driver of incoming obstacles, such as roadworks, pedestrians, and traffic lights or warning signs.

The rear-wheel-steering system for reducing the turning radius is optional at extra cost. The turning angle can be set at 4.5° or 10°, reducing the turning radius from 13.1 metres (43 ft) to 12.2 metres (40 ft) and 11.2 metres (37 ft) respectively.

The 4Matic AWD system used on non-AMG models uses Magna Trumax transfer case with an open double-planetary type center differential. A pre-loaded two plate clutch with a locking action of 50Nm links the front and rear outputs. The center differential is geared for a slightly rear-biased torque distribution of 45/55 front-to-rear. The Mercedes-Maybach S680 4Matic and S680 4Matic Guard models use a more rear-biased 31/69 standard torque distribution. AMG models use AMG Performance 4Matic+. This system replaces the open center differential with an electronically controlled multi-disc clutch which enables stepless coupling of the front axle to the drivetrain. The rear axle is permanently driven. Drive torque distribution to the front axle is infinitely variable throughout the range of between 0 and 50% of total gearbox output torque.

For the first time in a Mercedes-Benz vehicle, the S-Class has two different types of external door handles. The standard equipment is the grip handles as found in existing Mercedes-Benz vehicles while the optional extra cost equipment is the flush-fitted handles that pop outward electrically when the Keyless Go remote fob is in close proximity.

The models with six-cylinder inline petrol engines have a 48-volt electrical system with an integrated motor-generator to provide additional power when needed. This system also provides the power for the air conditioning system and for recharging the battery. The integrated motor-generator is also used as a starter motor in lieu of a separate and dedicated starter motor.

== Models ==
=== Mercedes-Benz ===
The engine range from W222 is carried over to W223 with inline six, V8, and V12. For the first time, the V12 engine is fitted with 4MATIC all-wheel-drive system and is exclusive to S 680 Guard 4MATIC. The 4MATIC system is standard equipment for most of S-Class models with exception of S 450 e. S 350 d and S 580 e can be ordered with 4MATIC system as extra-cost option. All models except S 680 Guard 4MATIC are offered in both standard and long wheelbases.

==== Mercedes-Benz S 680 Guard 4MATIC ====
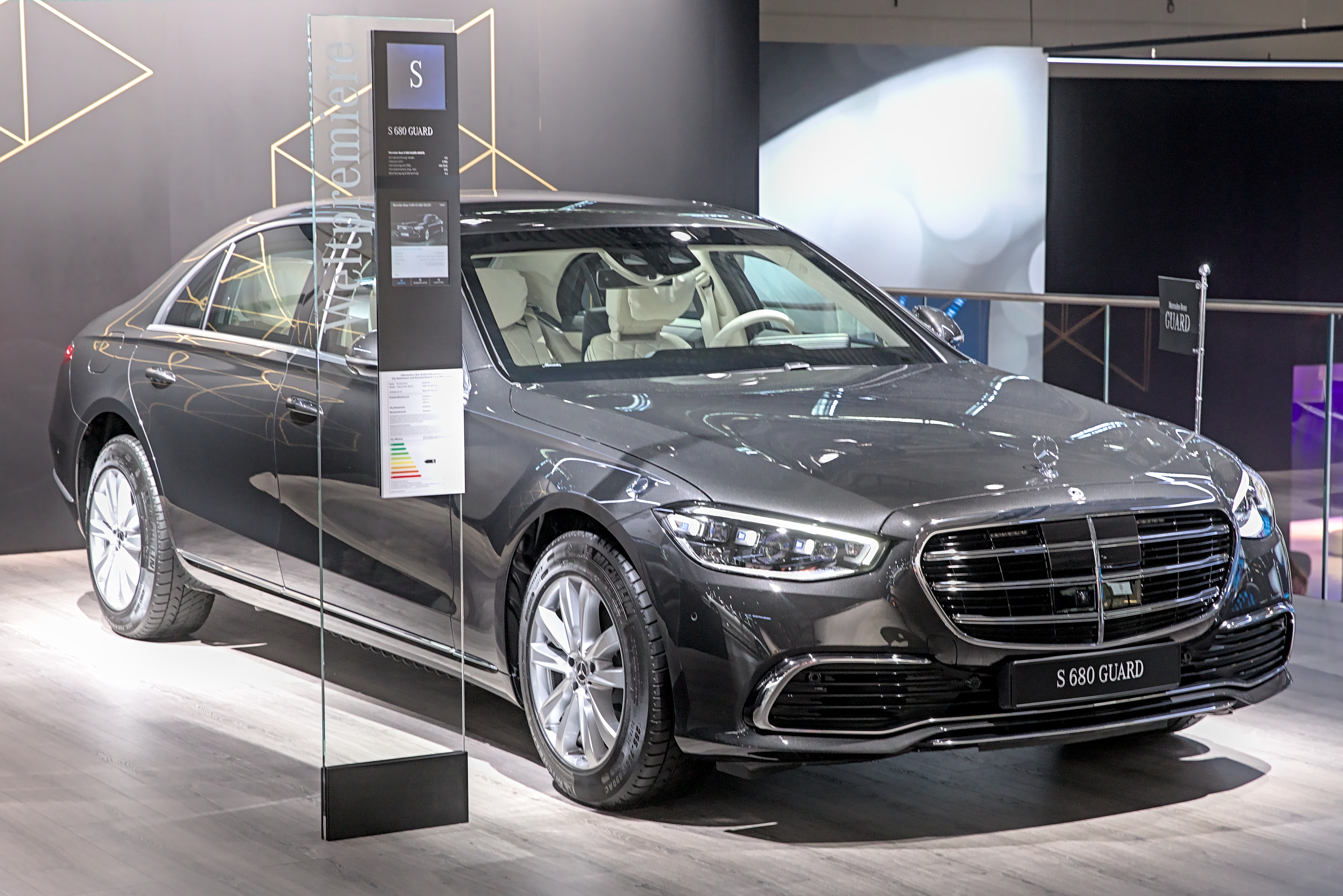
Mercedes-Benz S 680 Guard (W223)

On 28 July 2021, Mercedes-Benz announced the new armoured S 680 Guard 4MATIC. The S 680 Guard 4MATIC has VPAM VR10 armour level.

Due to its higher mass, the top speed limit is reduced to 190 km/h (118 mph).

=== Mercedes-Maybach ===
The Z223 Mercedes-Maybach S-Class was revealed on 19 November 2020 with model designations S 580 4MATIC and S 680 4MATIC. The Mercedes-Maybach is 18 centimetres longer than the predecessor. Several design cues, separating the Mercedes-Maybach from Mercedes-Benz, are carried over. Another first for Mercedes-Benz is the frontal airbags for the rear passengers.

Available engines are a 3-litre six-cylinder inline petrol for S 580 e 4MATIC, 4-litre biturbo V8 for the S 580 4MATIC, and a 6-litre biturbo V12 for the S 680 4MATIC. Both are fitted with standard 4MATIC all-wheel-drive system.

Exclusive to the Chinese market, an S 480 4MATIC with 3-litre six-cylinder inline petrol engine is offered due to the high taxation on engine displacement.

In Germany Mercedes-Maybach announced the launch date of May 2021 for ordering and the delivery date of July 2021.

Mercedes-Benz launched the S 580 4MATIC and the S 680 4MATIC in India on 3 March 2022. The S 580 4MATIC is assembled at Mercedes-Benz manufacturing plant in Chakan, Pune.

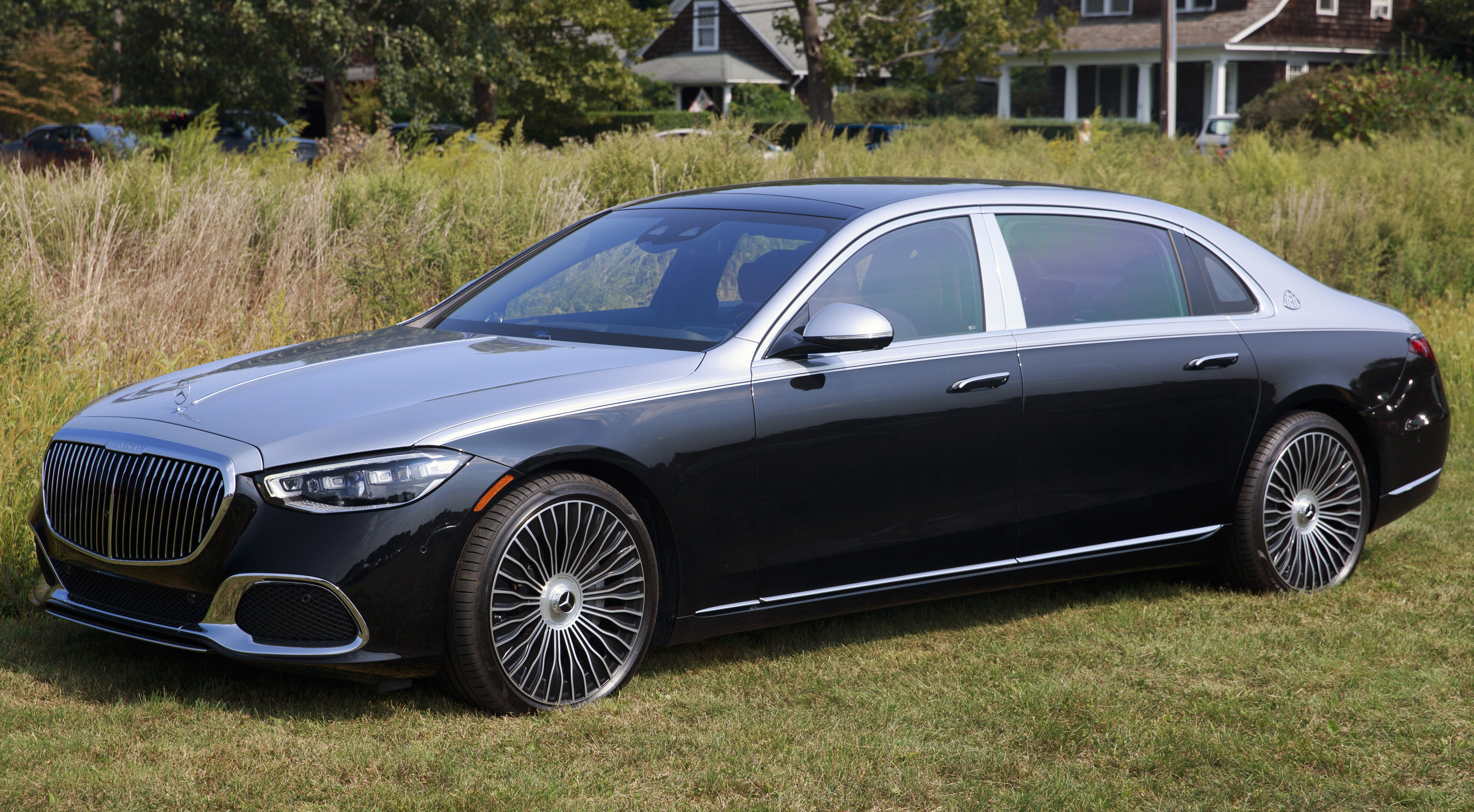
Mercedes-Maybach S 580

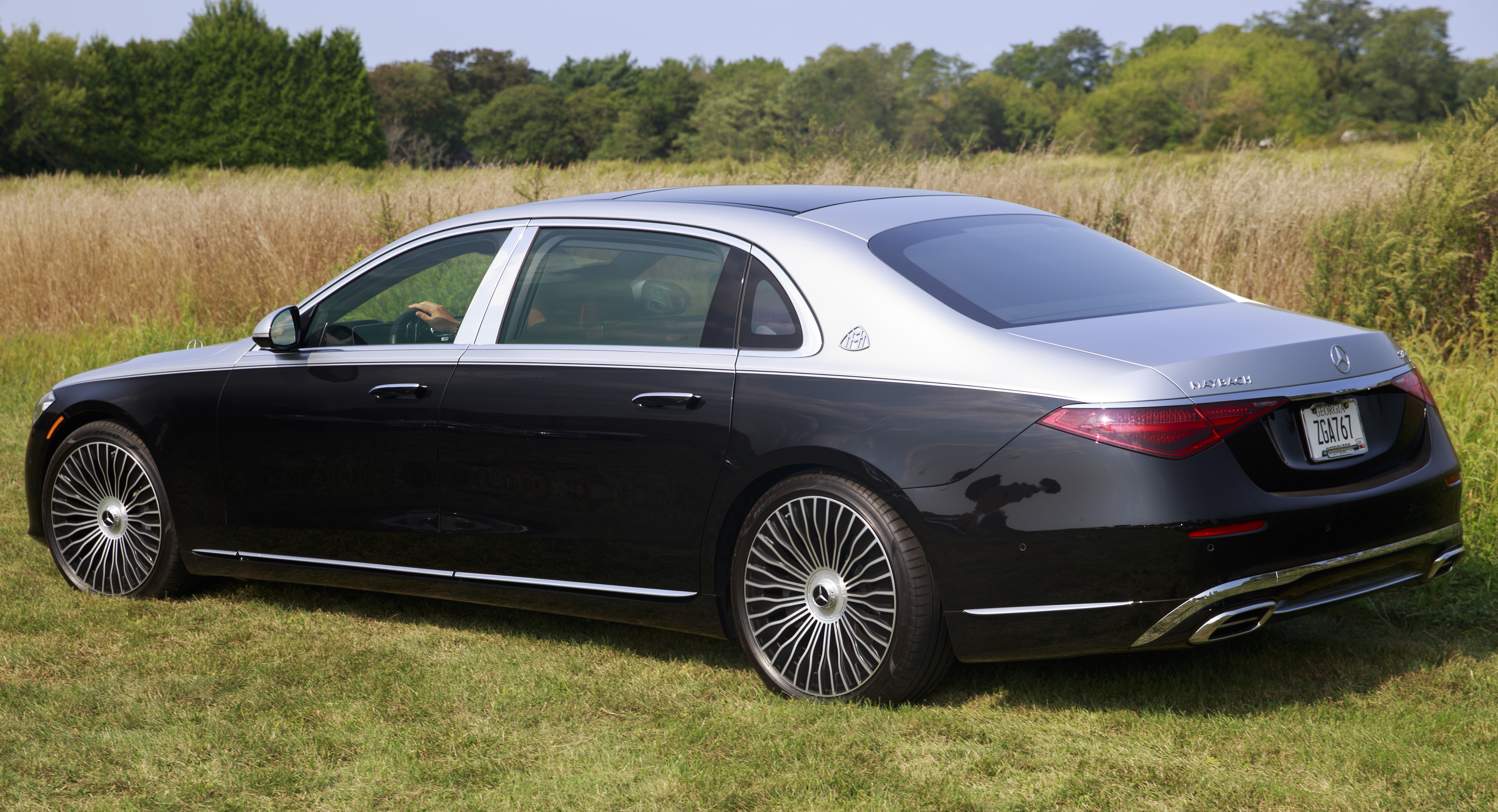
Mercedes-Maybach S-Class (rear view)

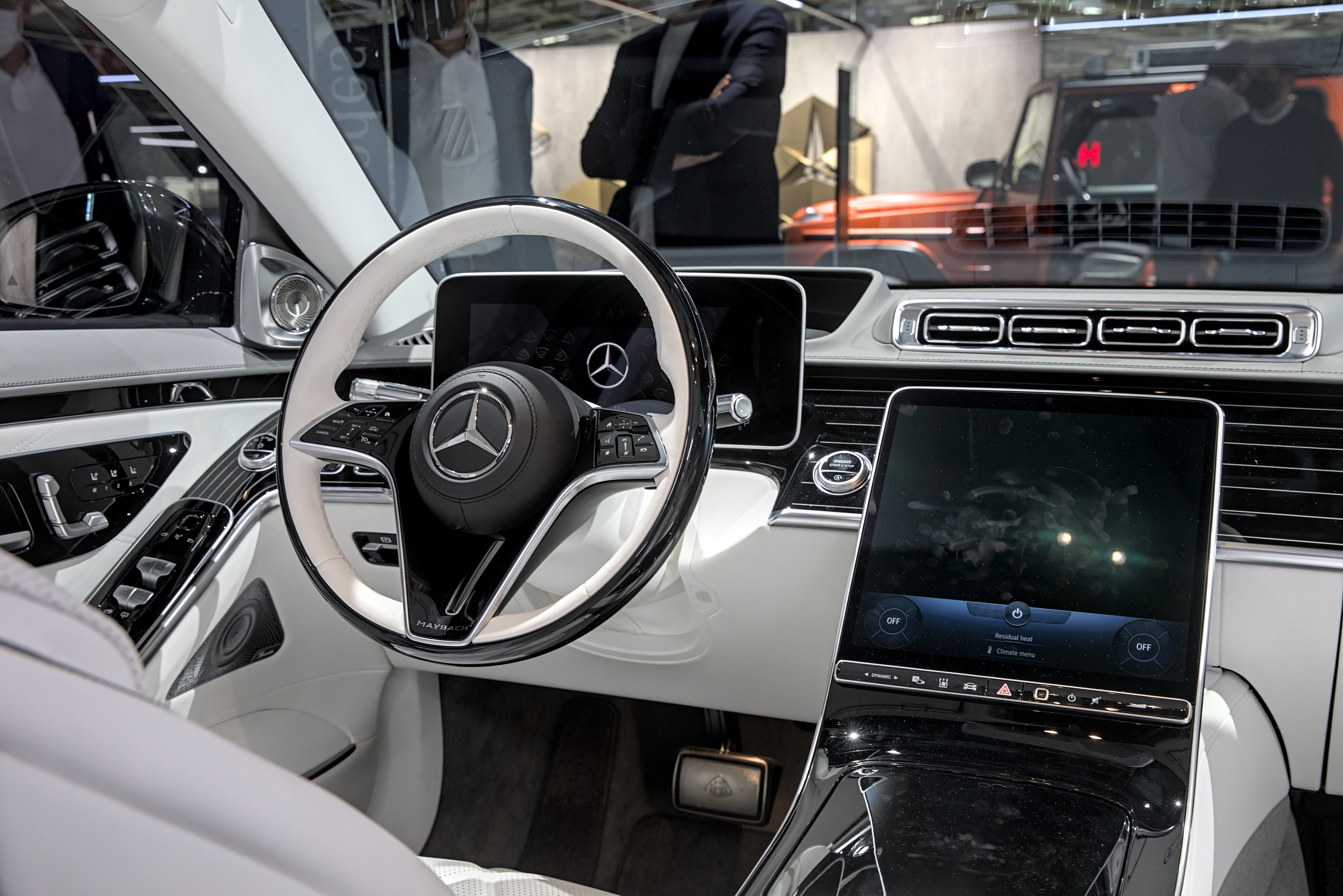
Mercedes-Maybach S 680 (interior)

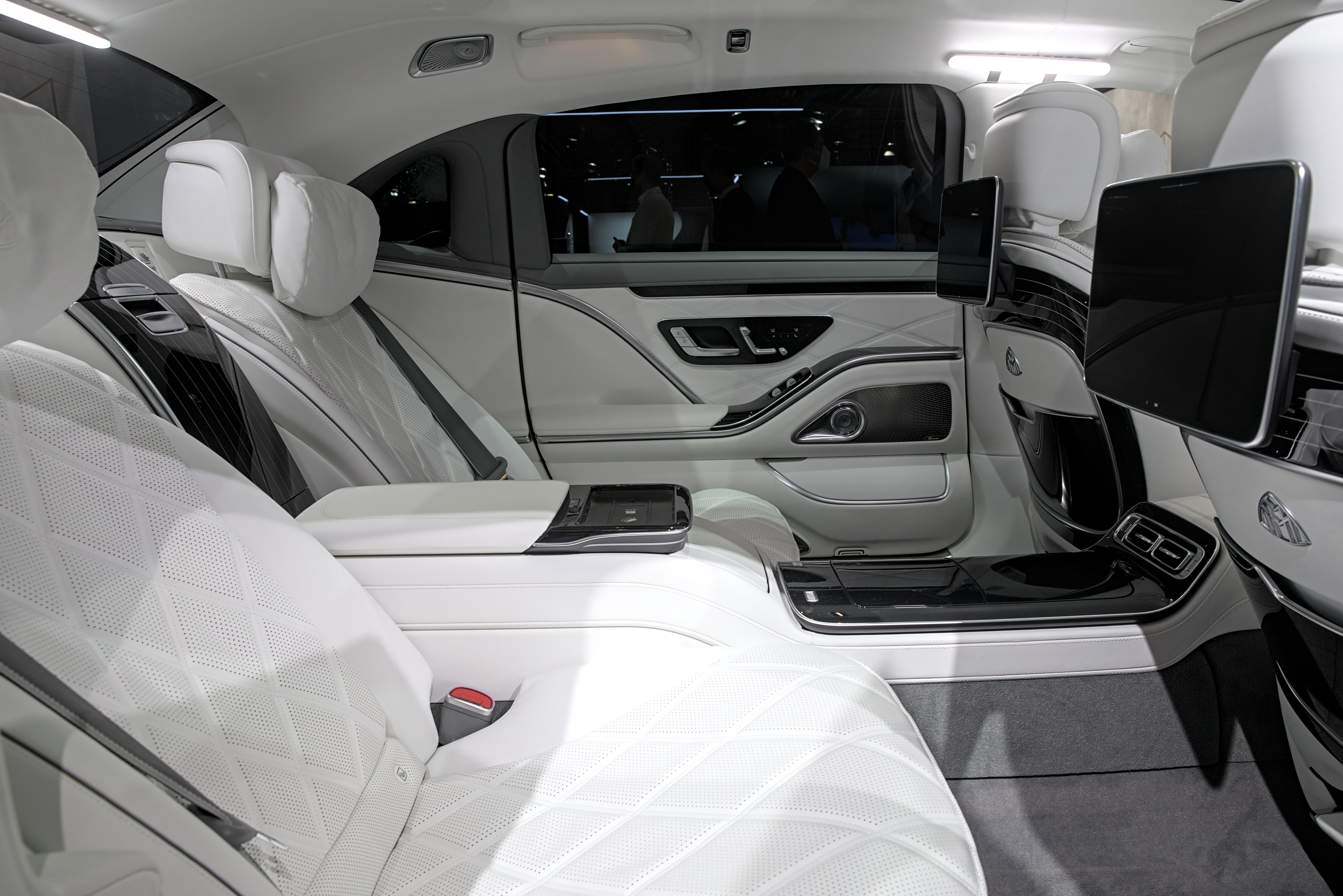
Back seat

==== Mercedes-Maybach S 580 e ====
The Mercedes-Maybach S 580 e debuted in February 2023 as the brand's first plug-in hybrid model, featuring an inline-six engine and an electric motor that produce a combined 510 PS (375 kW; 503 hp) output.

==== Mercedes-Maybach S 680 "Edition 100" ====
To commemorate the 100-year anniversary of first production car by Maybach Motorenbau GmbH in 1921, Mercedes-Benz launched the limited production of Mercedes-Maybach S 680 "Edition 100". The production is limited to 100 units.

The S 680 "Edition 100" has the special two-tone paint colours: High Tech Silver (Hightechsilber) on lower part and Nautical Blue (Nautikblau) on the upper part. The interior is done with special upholstery design in two-tone colours: Crystal White and Silver-grey Pearl.

==== Mercedes-Maybach S 680 Haute Voiture ====
The Mercedes-Maybach S 680 Haute Voiture is a special edition of the S 680 that is based on "haute couture" (high fashion). It was presented in May 2022 in a concept form, with Mercedes later confirming intentions to put the Haute Voiture into production, with the production version being unveiled in December following a Dubai fashion show.

The car features a two-tone paint job consisting of Nautical Blue and Rose Gold above and below the belt line, respectively. This color is exclusive to the Haute Voiture. It sports monoblock wheels painted to match the blue paint on the upper body. The body is also adorned with chrome trim.

For the interior, the car is upholstered in Bouclé, a type of fabric woven from yarn, that incorporates blue, beige, rose gold, and various other shades of gold into the pattern, with additional crystal and glossy opal white features. The car comes with a set of linen and mohair (yarn made from goat hair) floor mats, as well as a set of rose gold champagne flutes.

The MBUX system was upgraded with the intention to emphasize the atmosphere of a fashion show catwalk, with sparkling glitter clouds and a variety of rose gold accents. Drivers are greeted with sparkling particles and a magnolia blossom on the profile selection menu, and available are 12 different elegantly dressed avatars, such as in a tailcoat, evening gown, and dinner jacket, and are adorned with fine accessories.

The Haute Voiture is accompanied by a special hand-made gift box containing a key ring, its badge number, and a scale model. Mercedes will also be releasing a bag collection, made of materials of the vehicle's interior, to be available in different sizes and styles. The bag collection has been released in early 2023 in limited run and are available at both Maybach Icons of Luxury physical and online stores.

The Mercedes-Maybach S 680 Haute Voiture is launched in early 2023 and is strictly limited to 150 units.

==== Mercedes-Maybach S-Klasse "Maybach by Virgil Abloh" S 680 ====
As inspired by the "Project MAYBACH", Mercedes-Benz introduced the Mercedes-Maybach S-Klasse "Maybach by Virgil Abloh" S 680 that interpreted the style, fashion, material, and design directions set by Virgil Abloh and Gorden Wagener for their "Project MAYBACH" Show Car. The special edition honours Virgil Abloh, who died in 2021 from cancer.

Only 152 were produced, and 39 were sold in the United States to artists, celebrities, and other influential individuals. Alicia Keys was the first person to receive an S-Klasse "Maybach by Virgil Abloh” S 680, as a gift from her husband Swizz Beatz.

It has 2-tone paint with a top in obsidian black and a tan bottom with tan wheels. The interior has sand-colored Nappa leather accented by black trim on the doors, center console, and steering wheel. Customers also got a 1/18-scale replica of the car inside a custom-made wooden box wrapped in tan Nappa leather, along with a special car cover with the Maybach and Abloh logo. Rick Ross was offered an S 680 but declined.

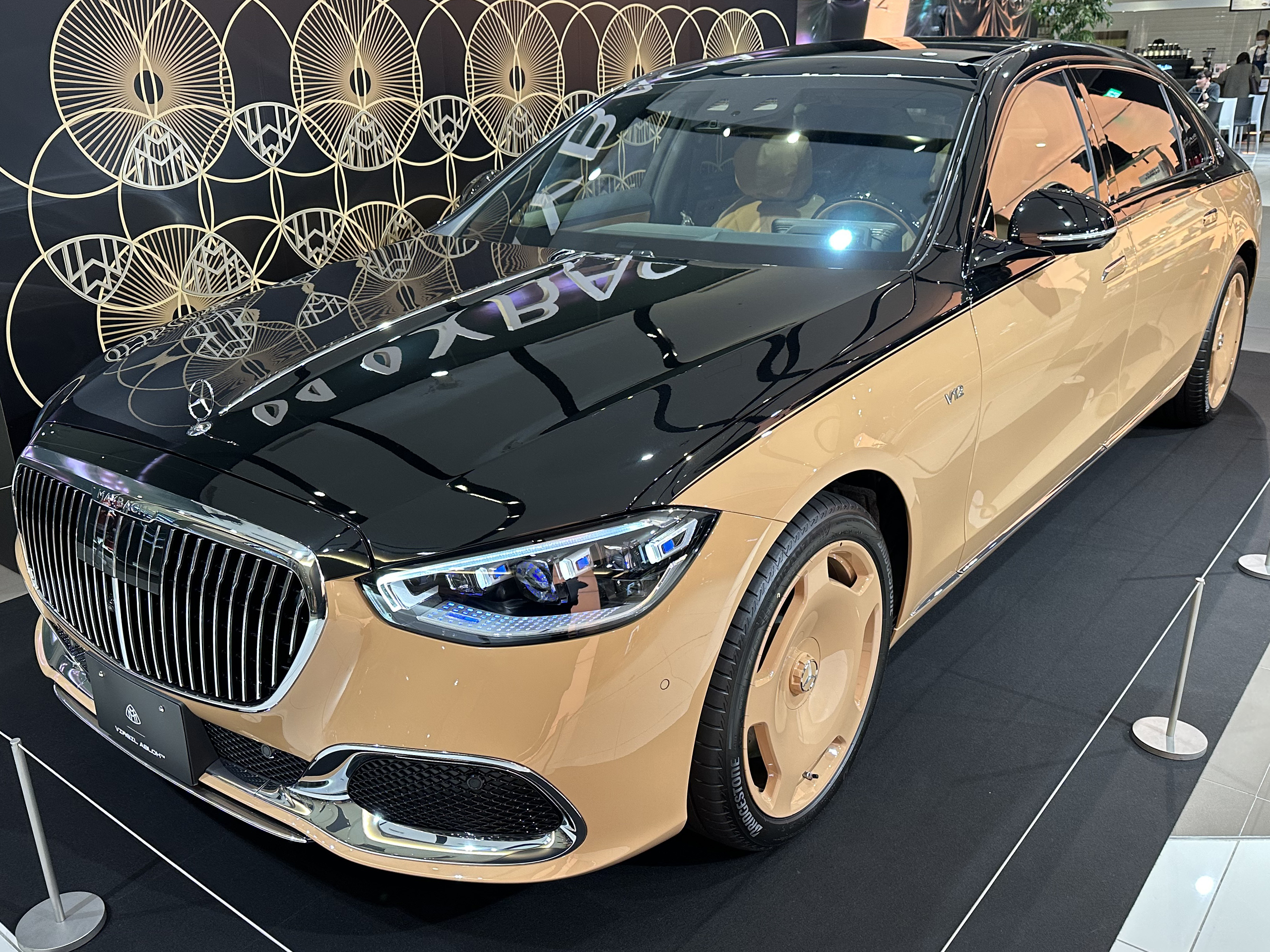
Mercedes-Maybach S-Klasse "Maybach by Virgil Abloh" S 680

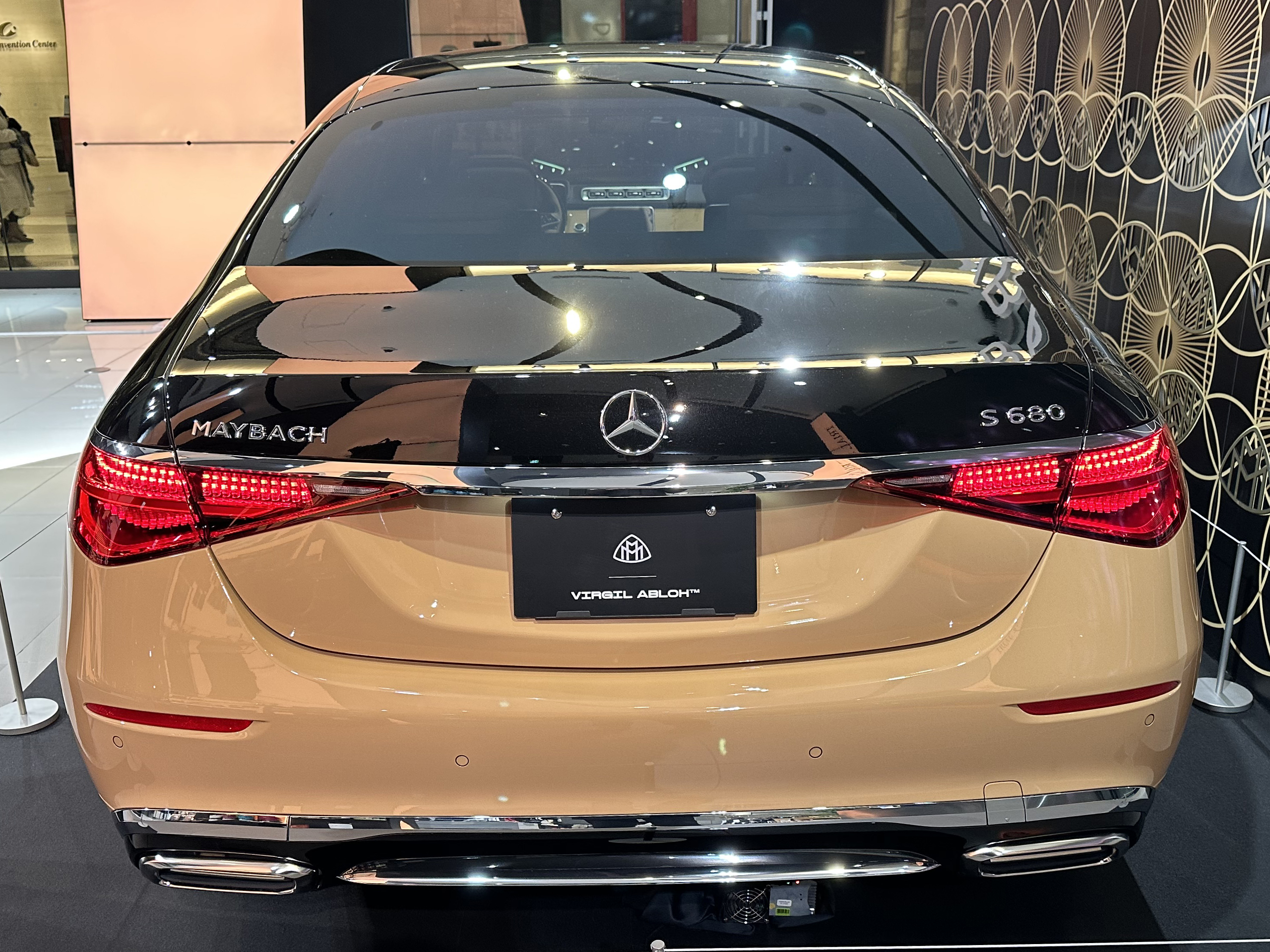
Rear view

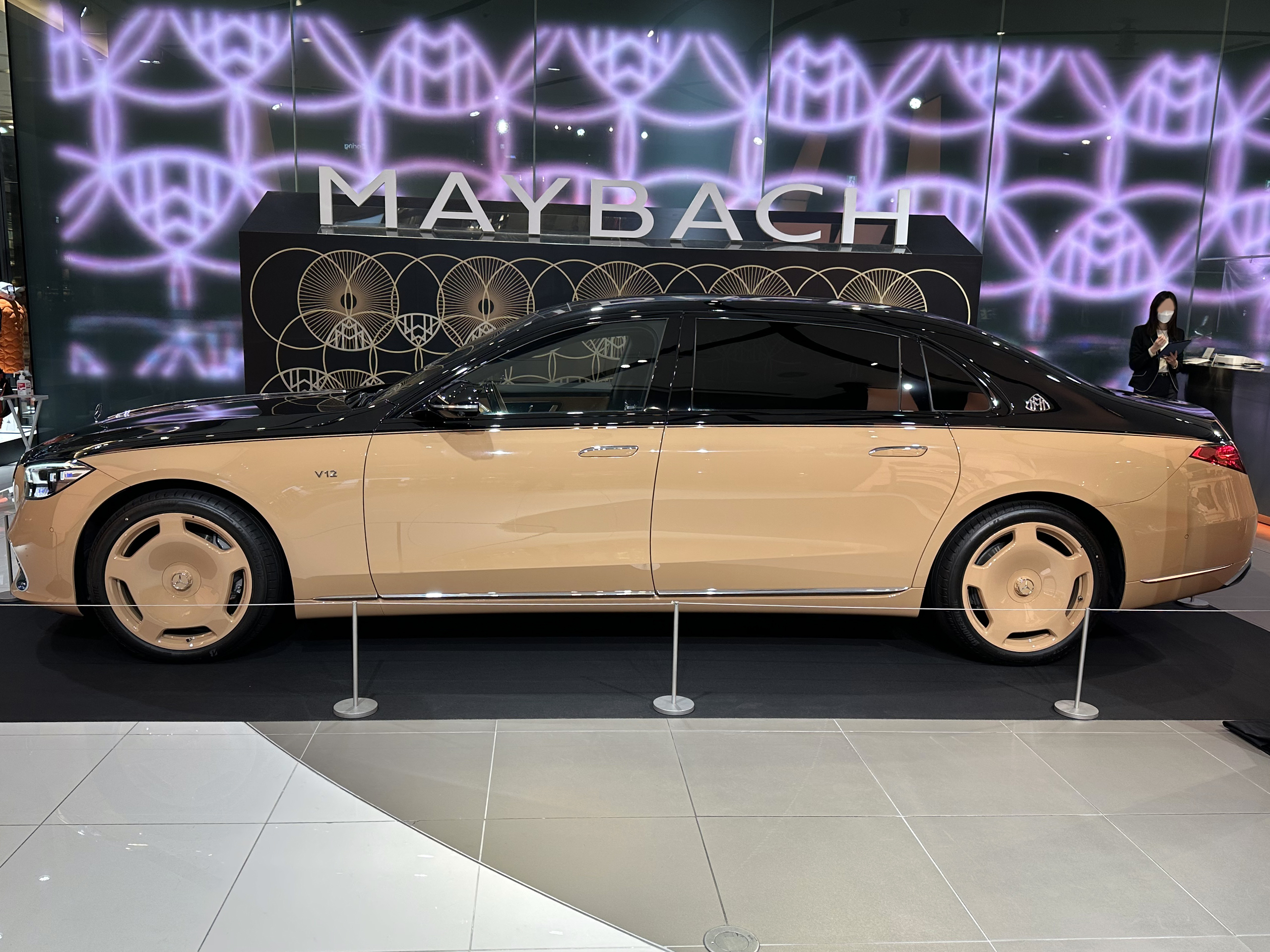
Side view

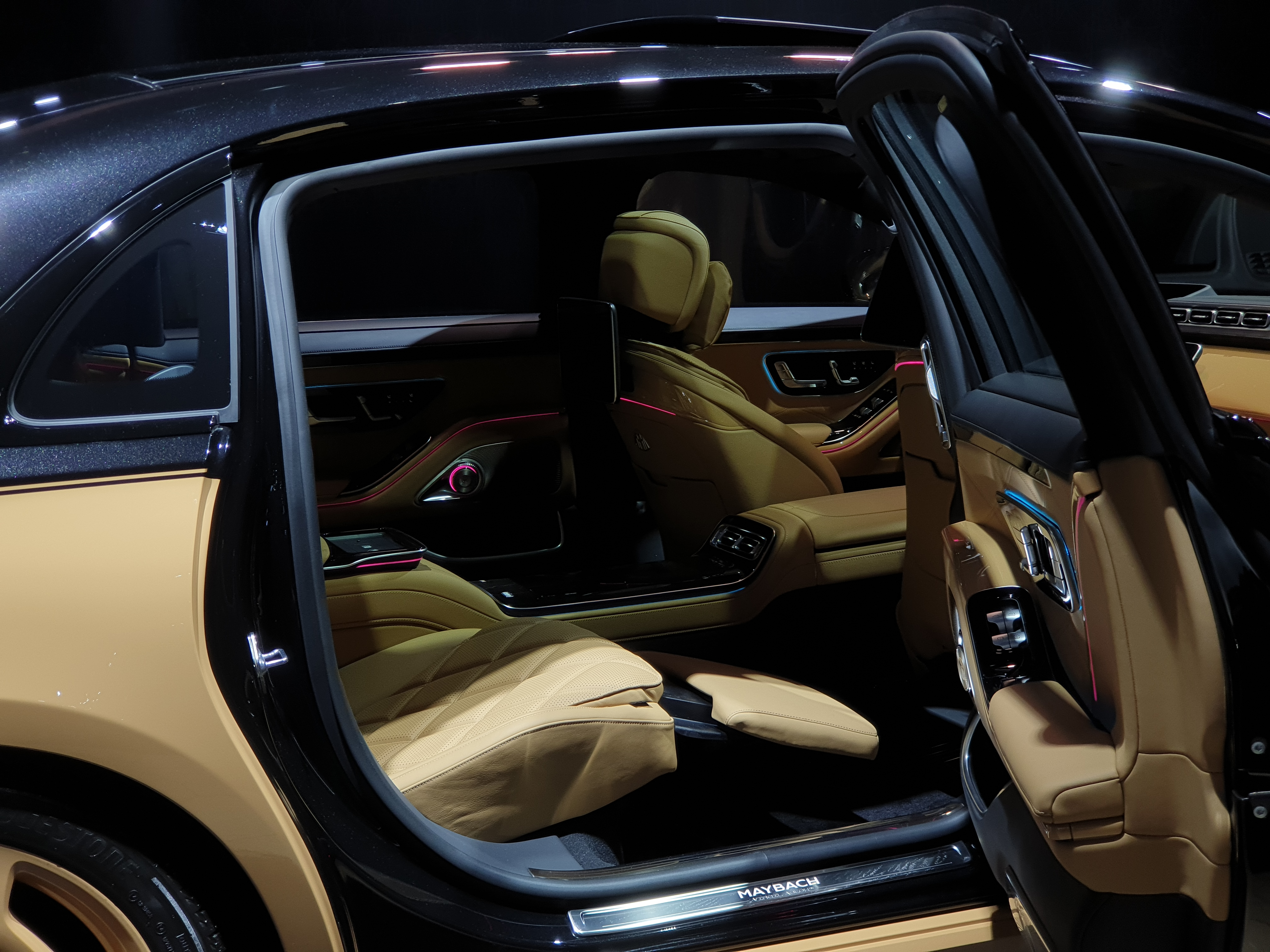
Interior

=== Mercedes-AMG ===
==== S 63 E Performance ====
In December 2022, the Mercedes-AMG S 63 E Performance, the high performance version of the S-Class, was introduced. It uses a plug-in hybrid drivetrain, which is powered by a 4.0 L twin-turbo V8 in the form of the M177, along with an electric motor and 13.1 kWh battery pack. The car produces a combined 802 PS (791 hp) and 1,430 N⋅m (1,055 lb⋅ft) of torque. The car can accelerate from 0 to 100 km/h (0 to 62 mph) in 3.2 seconds. Additionally, the new S 63 E Performance has a top speed of 250 km/h (155 mph), however when coupled with the AMG Driver's Package, the top speed will increase to roughly 290 km/h (180 mph).

For the first time in the S-Class sedan's history, the design features a Panamericana style grille design with a large Mercedes-Benz logo in the center, instead of a hood ornament like on the standard models.

In June 2023, buyers who ordered their S 63 E Performance upon the opening of the order book on 5 April 2023 were informed that the delivery of their orders would not take place until the first quarter of 2025.

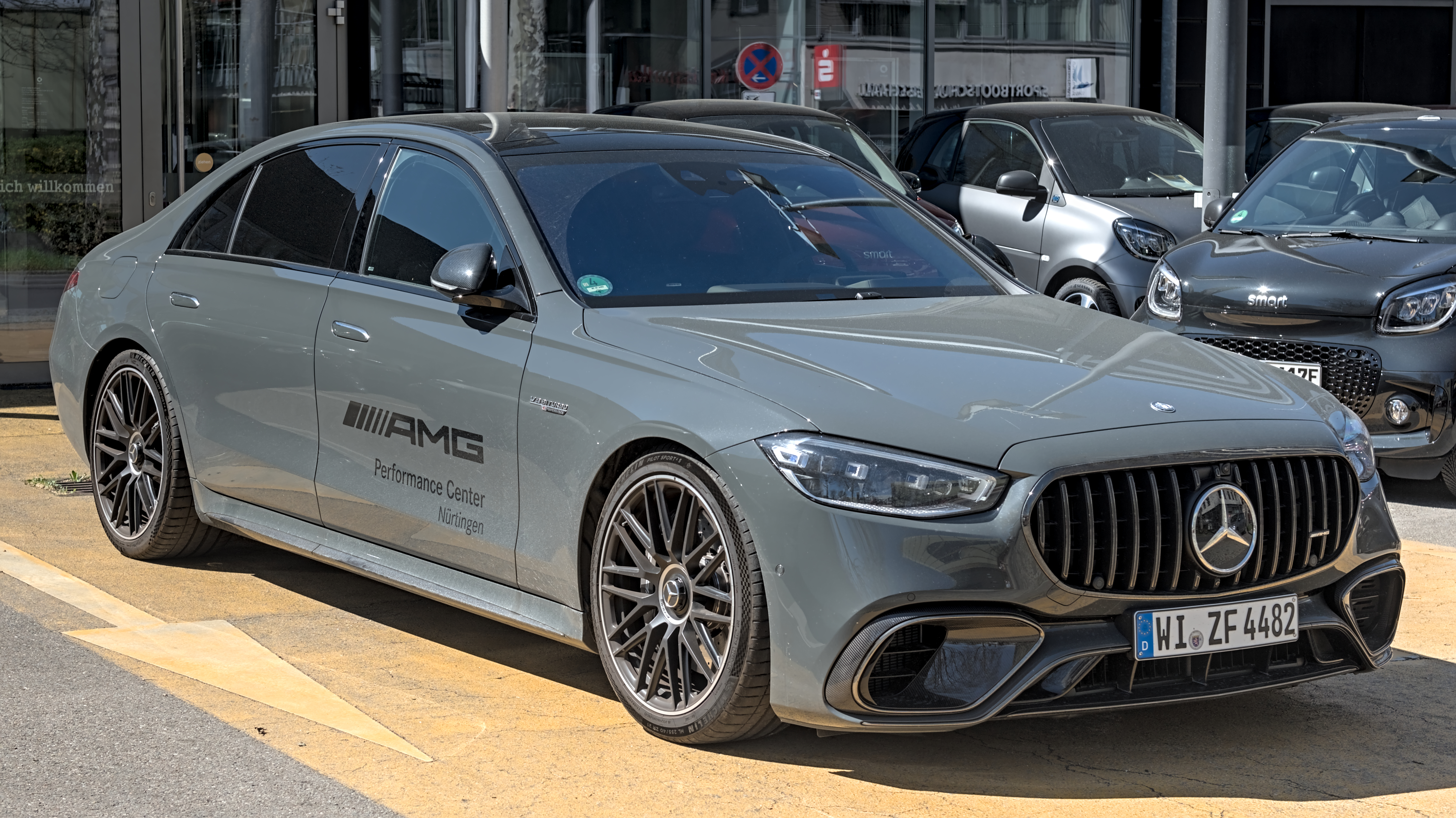
Mercedes-AMG S 63 E Performance

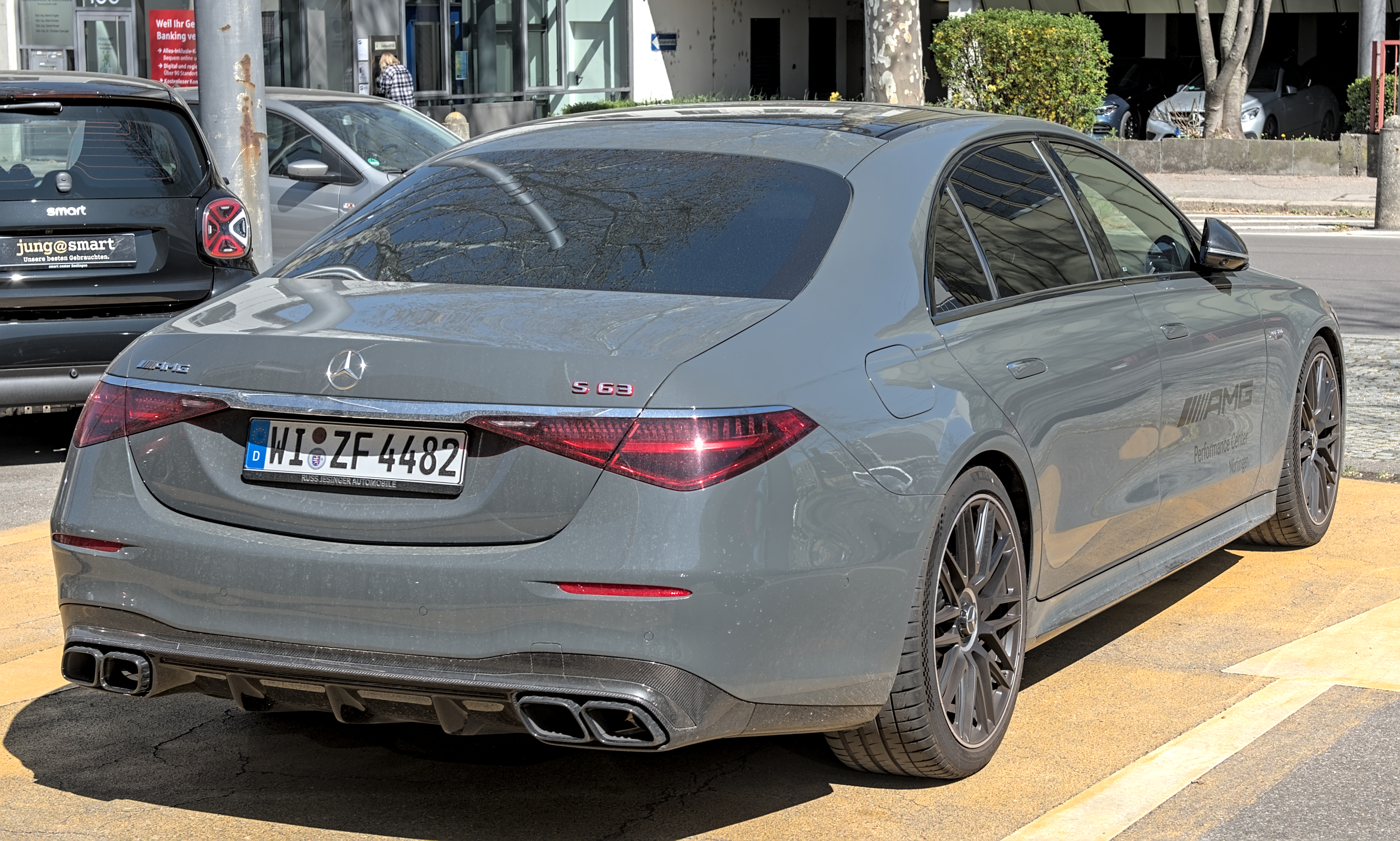
Rear view

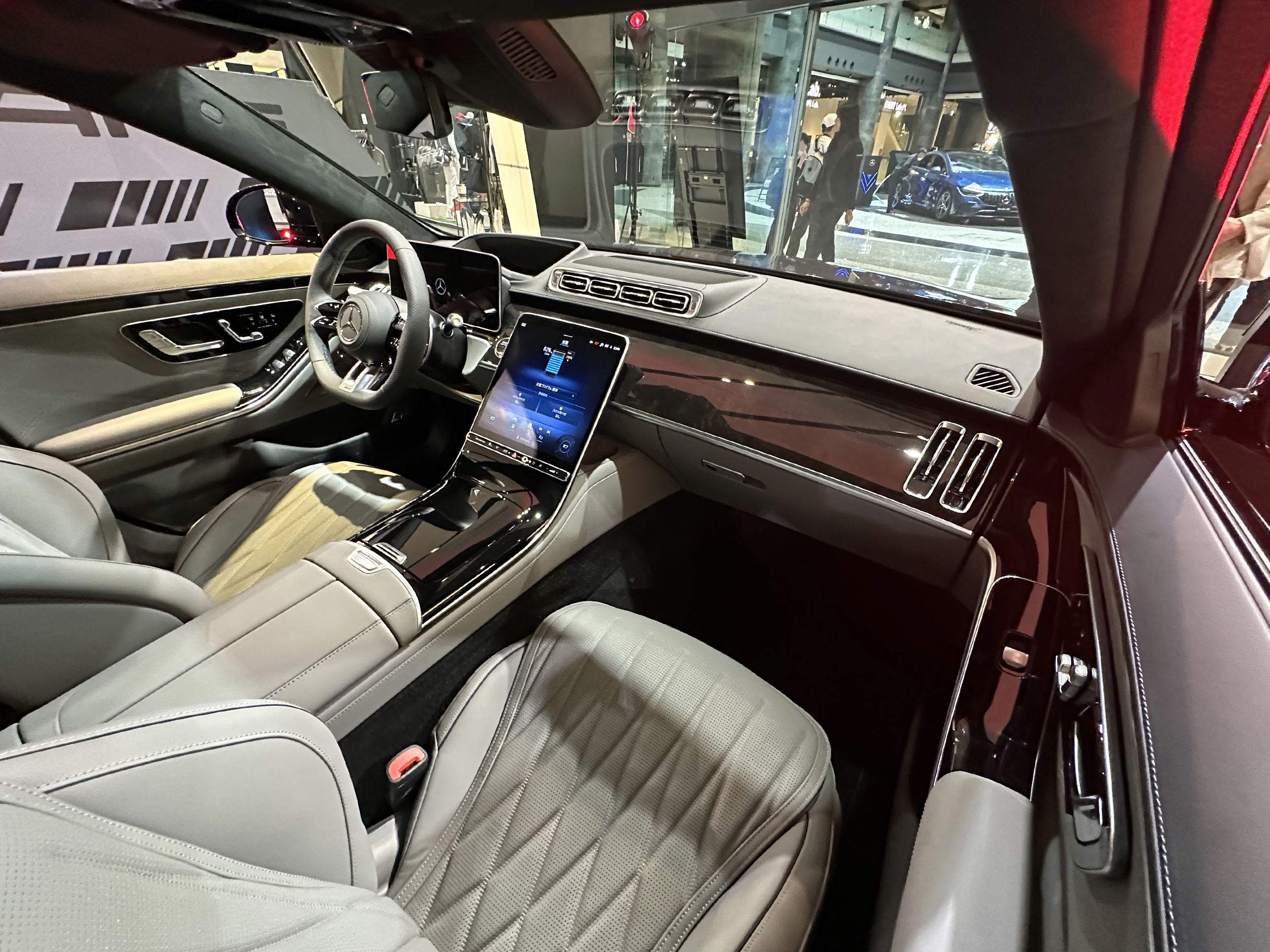
Interior

== Technical data ==
=== Engines ===
The engines are carried over from previous generation of S-Class (W222) with two petrol and diesel six-cylinder inline engines at launch. Mercedes-Benz launched the models with V8 and V12 engines in May 2021. A first for a Mercedes-Benz passenger car, the V12 is fitted with the 4MATIC all-wheel-drive system. No diesel PHEV models have been introduced (as of November 2023).

Model	Years	Configuration	Displacement	Power	Torque	0–100 km/h (0–62 mph)	Top speed (km/h)	Fuel consumption/efficiency (NEDC)
Petrol engines
S 400 L (China)	March 2022 – present	M 256 I6 turbo + 48V Mild Hybrid EQ Boost	2,498 cc (152.4 cu in)	230 kW (310 PS; 310 bhp) at 5,500 rpm 16 kW (22 PS; 21 bhp) (electric)	450 N⋅m (332 lb⋅ft) at 1,800–4,500 rpm 250 N⋅m (184 lb⋅ft) (electric)	5.9 seconds	250 km/h (155 mph)	9.2–7.94 L/100 km (25.6–29.6 mpg_{‑US})
S 450 L (China)	March 2022 – present	M 256 I6 turbo + 48V Mild Hybrid EQ Boost	2,498 cc (152.4 cu in)	270 kW (367 PS; 362 bhp) at 6,000 rpm 16 kW (22 PS; 21 bhp) (electric)	500 N⋅m (369 lb⋅ft) at 2,000–4,000 rpm 250 N⋅m (184 lb⋅ft) (electric)	5.6 seconds	250 km/h (155 mph)	8.7–7.68 L/100 km (27.0–30.6 mpg_{‑US})
S 450 L 4MATIC (China)	March 2022 – present	M 256 I6 turbo + 48V Mild Hybrid EQ Boost	2,498 cc (152.4 cu in)	270 kW (367 PS; 362 bhp) at 6,000 rpm 16 kW (22 PS; 21 bhp) (electric)	500 N⋅m (369 lb⋅ft) at 2,000–4,000 rpm 250 N⋅m (184 lb⋅ft) (electric)	5.6 seconds	250 km/h (155 mph)	8.7–7.68 L/100 km (27.0–30.6 mpg_{‑US})
S 450 4MATIC	December 2020 – present	M 256 E30 DEH LA GR I6 turbo	2,999 cc (183.0 cu in)	270 kW (367 PS; 362 bhp) at 5,500–6,100 rpm	500 N⋅m (369 lb⋅ft) at 1,600–4,500 rpm	5.1 seconds	250 km/h (155 mph)	8.3–7.8 L/100 km (28–30 mpg_{‑US}) (Standard); 8.4–7.8 L/100 km (28–30 mpg_{‑US}) (Long)
Mercedes-Maybach; S 480 4MATIC (China)	July 2021 – present	M 256 E30 DEH LA GR I6 turbo	2,999 cc (183.0 cu in)	270 kW (367 PS; 362 bhp) at 5,500–6,100 rpm	500 N⋅m (369 lb⋅ft) at 1,600–4,500 rpm	5.8 seconds	250 km/h (155 mph)	8.6 L/100 km (27 mpg_{‑US})
S 500 4MATIC	December 2020 – present	M 256 E30 DEH LA G I6 turbo + 48V Mild Hybrid EQ Boost	2,999 cc (183.0 cu in)	320 kW (435 PS; 429 bhp) at 5,500–6,100 rpm 16 kW (22 PS; 21 bhp) (electric)	520 N⋅m (384 lb⋅ft) at 1,600–4,500 rpm 250 N⋅m (184 lb⋅ft) (electric)	4.9 seconds	250 km/h (155 mph)	8.4–7.8 L/100 km (28–30 mpg_{‑US}) (Standard and Long)
S 580 4MATIC	June 2021 – present	M176 DE40 LA V8 biturbo + 48V Mild Hybrid EQ Boost	3,982 cc (243.0 cu in)	370 kW (503 PS; 496 bhp) at 5,500 rpm 15 kW (20 PS; 20 bhp) (electric)	700 N⋅m (516 lb⋅ft) at 2,000–4,000 rpm 180 N⋅m (133 lb⋅ft) (electric)	4.4 seconds	250 km/h (155 mph)	10.6–10.0 L/100 km (22–24 mpg_{‑US}) (Standard and Long)
Mercedes-Maybach; S 580 4MATIC	July 2021 – present	M176 DE40 LA V8 biturbo + 48V Mild Hybrid EQ Boost	3,982 cc (243.0 cu in)	370 kW (503 PS; 496 bhp) at 5,500 rpm 15 kW (20 PS; 20 bhp) (electric)	700 N⋅m (516 lb⋅ft) at 2,000–4,000 rpm 180 N⋅m (133 lb⋅ft) (electric)	4.8 seconds	250 km/h (155 mph)	10.6–10.0 L/100 km (22–24 mpg_{‑US}) (Standard and Long)
S 680 Guard 4MATIC	July 2021 – present	M279 E60 LA V12 biturbo	5,980 cc (365 cu in)	450 kW (612 PS; 603 bhp) at 4,800–5,400 rpm	830 N⋅m (612 lb⋅ft) 2,300–4,300 rpm	T.B.A.	190 km/h (118 mph)	T.B.A.
Mercedes-Maybach; S 680 4MATIC	July 2021 – present	M279 E60 LA V12 biturbo	5,980 cc (365 cu in)	450 kW (612 PS; 603 bhp) at 4,800–5,400 rpm	900 N⋅m (664 lb⋅ft) 2,300–4,300 rpm	4.5 seconds	250 km/h (155 mph)	14.1–13.3 L/100 km (16.7–17.7 mpg_{‑US})
Diesel engines
S 350 d	December 2020 – present	OM 656 D29T R SCR 2.9 L I6 turbo	2,925 cc (178.5 cu in)	210 kW (286 PS; 282 bhp) at 3,400–4,600 rpm	600 N⋅m (443 lb⋅ft) at 1,200–3,200 rpm	6.4 seconds	250 km/h (155 mph)	6.7–6.2 L/100 km (35–38 mpg_{‑US}) (Standard and Long)
S 350 d 4MATIC	December 2020 – present	OM 656 D29T R SCR 2.9 L I6 turbo	2,925 cc (178.5 cu in)	210 kW (286 PS; 282 bhp) at 3,400–4,600 rpm	600 N⋅m (443 lb⋅ft) at 1,200–3,200 rpm	6.2 seconds	250 km/h (155 mph)	6.8–6.3 L/100 km (35–37 mpg_{‑US}) (Standard); 6.9–6.4 L/100 km (34–37 mpg_{‑US}) (Long)
S 400 d 4MATIC	December 2020 – present	OM 656 D29T R SCR 2.9 L I6 turbo	2,925 cc (178.5 cu in)	243 kW (330 PS; 326 bhp) at 3,600–4,200 rpm	700 N⋅m (516 lb⋅ft) at 1,200–3,200 rpm	5.4 seconds	250 km/h (155 mph)	6.9–6.4 L/100 km (34–37 mpg_{‑US}) (Standard); 7.0–6.5 L/100 km (34–36 mpg_{‑US}) (Long)
S 450 d 4MATIC	2023 – present	OM656 D30T M 3.0 L I6 turbo	2,989 cc (182.4 cu in)	270 kW (367 PS; 362 bhp) + 15 kW (20 PS; 20 bhp) at 3,600–4,200 rpm	750 N⋅m (553 lb⋅ft) at 1,200–3,200 rpm	4.6 seconds	250 km/h (155 mph)	
Plug-in hybrid engine
S 450 e	May 2022 – present	M 256 E30 DEH LA GR I6 turbo + electric motor	2,999 cc (183.0 cu in)	220 kW (299 PS; 295 bhp) at 5,500–6,100 rpm 110 kW (150 PS; 148 bhp) (electric)	450 N⋅m (332 lbf⋅ft) at 1,600–4,500 rpm 440 N⋅m (325 lbf⋅ft) (electric)	5.9 seconds (Standard and Long)	250 km/h (155 mph)	0.9–0.6 L/100 km (260–390 mpg_{‑US}) (Standard and Long)
S 580 e	September 2021 – present	M 256 E30 DEH LA GR I6 turbo + electric motor	2,999 cc (183.0 cu in)	270 kW (367 PS; 362 bhp) at 5,500–6,100 rpm 110 kW (150 PS; 148 bhp) (electric); 375 kW (510 PS; 503 bhp) (combined)	500 N⋅m (369 lbf⋅ft) at 1,600–4,500 rpm 440 N⋅m (325 lbf⋅ft) (electric); 750 N⋅m (553 lbf⋅ft) (combined)	5.2 seconds (Standard and Long)	250 km/h (155 mph)	1.5–1.1 L/100 km (160–210 mpg_{‑US}) (Standard and Long)
Mercedes-Maybach; S 580 e	June 2023 – present	M 256 E30 DEH LA GR I6 turbo + electric motor	2,999 cc (183.0 cu in)	270 kW (367 PS; 362 bhp) at 5,500–6,100 rpm 110 kW (150 PS; 148 bhp) (electric); 375 kW (510 PS; 503 bhp) (combined)	500 N⋅m (369 lbf⋅ft) at 1,600–4,500 rpm 440 N⋅m (325 lbf⋅ft) (electric); 750 N⋅m (553 lbf⋅ft) (combined)	5.1 seconds	250 km/h (155 mph)	
Mercedes-AMG S 63 E Performance	April 2023 – present	M177 V8 biturbo + electric motor	3,982 cc (243.0 cu in)	450 kW (612 PS; 603 bhp) at 5,500–6,500 rpm 140 kW (190 PS; 188 bhp) (electric)	900 N⋅m (664 lbf⋅ft) at 2,500–4,500 rpm 320 N⋅m (236 lbf⋅ft) (electric)	3.3 seconds	250 km/h (155 mph)/290 km/h (180 mph) (AMG Driver's Package)	4.6 l/100 km (51 mpg_{‑US})

=== Transmission ===
At launch, all models are fitted with the nine-speed 9G-Tronic automatic transmission. The new AMG S 63 E Performance is also fitted with an additional 2-speed transmission specifically for the electric motor.

=== Dimensions ===
The S-Class is offered in both standard and long wheelbases for most of the markets. In certain markets such as United States, China, Russia, and Turkey, the S-Class are sold in long wheelbase version only. In China, the S-Class have "L" suffix badge while the German and international markets do not.

Model	Length	Wheelbase	Height	Width	Width incl. mirrors	Front track	Rear track	Weight
Standard (W223)	5,179 mm (203.9 in)	3,106 mm (122.3 in)	1,503 mm (59.2 in)	1,954 mm (76.9 in)	2,109 mm (83.0 in)	1,660 mm (65 in)	1,688 mm (66.5 in)	1,995 kg (4,398 lb) – 2,095 kg (4,619 lb)
Long (V223)	5,289 mm (208.2 in)	3,216 mm (126.6 in)	1,503 mm (59.2 in)	1,954 mm (76.9 in)	2,109 mm (83.0 in)	1,660 mm (65 in)	1,688 mm (66.5 in)	2,015 kg (4,442 lb) – 2,115 kg (4,663 lb)
Mercedes-Maybach (Z223)	5,470 mm (215 in)	3,396 mm (133.7 in)	1,503 mm (59.2 in)	1,954 mm (76.9 in)	2,109 mm (83.0 in)	1,660 mm (65 in)	1,688 mm (66.5 in)	2,290 kg (5,050 lb) – 2,350 kg (5,180 lb)

== W223 facelift (2026) ==
A mid-cycle refresh for the seventh generation S-Class debuted on January 29, 2026. More than 2,700 parts (50% of the entire car) were either newly developed or re-engineered, making this the most comprehensive S-Class refresh within a single generation. Production on the standard model began in March 2026, with the Maybach following in April 2026.

The front end features a larger illuminated front grille with three-pointed stars forming slats. Similar to the W214 E-Class, the grille is connected to the redesigned headlights, which feature two stars each as the daytime running lights. Additionally, this is the first Mercedes-Benz to feature an illuminated three-pointed star on the hood. The taillights were redesigned, with each module housing three star-shaped lighting elements. There are a range of new wheel design options, one of which is a Manafaktur-exclusive high-pressure cast 20-inch wheels featuring 50 cross spokes.

The interior was also comprehensively updated, with a watercooled supercomputer running on MB.OS which handles all interior electronics, such as the MBUX Superscreen. According to Mercedes-Benz, the Superscreen was preferred over the Hyperscreen to provide a better viewing angle for the driver display, which is separated and more upright, while setting the main displays further back for increased ergonomics. In the rear, two fully detachable MBUX remotes are featured in the rear centre console. For the first time, native apps such as Disney+ and YouTube are offered directly through the MBUX system through the two 13.1-inch displays mounted on the seat backs. Additionally, heated seatbelts are available in all four seats.

The facelift model was launched in India on 15 June 2026, and with a plug-in hybrid (S 450e) variant for the first time, pushing 435hp, 680 Nm, and 115 km (71 mi) of pure EV range.

In terms of performance, power and torque have been increased in all models.

2026 Mercedes-Benz S-Class (W223)

Rear View

Interior (2026 facelift)

== See also ==
- Mercedes-Benz EQS
