= Maybach Music (disambiguation) =

Maybach Music Group is an American record label founded by Rick Ross.

Maybach Music may also refer to:

== Songs ==
- "Maybach Music 1" (song) 2008 song by Rick Ross, aka "Maybach Music"
- "Maybach Music 2" (song) 2009 song by Rick Ross
- "Maybach Music 3" (song) 2010 song by Rick Ross
- "Maybach Music IV" (song) 2012 song by Rick Ross
- "Maybach Music V" (song) 2017 song by Rick Ross
- "Maybach Music VI" (song) 2019 song by Rick Ross

== See also ==
- Rick Ross (U.S. rapper) of Maybach Music
- "Maybach" (song), a 2008 single by The Yellow Moon Band
- Category:Maybach Music Group albums
- Category:Maybach Music Group singles
- Maybach (disambiguation)
