= Ulrich Schmid-Maybach =

German philanthropist

Ulrich Schmid-Maybach is a philanthropist, real estate developer, and entrepreneur. He is the great-grandson and grandson of Wilhelm and Karl Maybach, respectively. When Daimler AG re-launched the Maybach brand of ultra-luxury automobiles, Schmid-Maybach was named brand ambassador. Inspired by the mentorship of Wilhelm Maybach by Gottlieb Daimler, Schmid-Maybach founded the Wilhelm and Karl Maybach Foundation, to "give exceptionally talented young individuals the chance to change the world." He resides in San Francisco, but his work and his involvement in the Foundation require he spend much of the time traveling.

== See also ==
- Maybach Foundation
- Wilhelm Maybach
- Maybach Brand
