= Maybach Foundation =

US-based non-profit organization

The Wilhelm and Karl Maybach Foundation
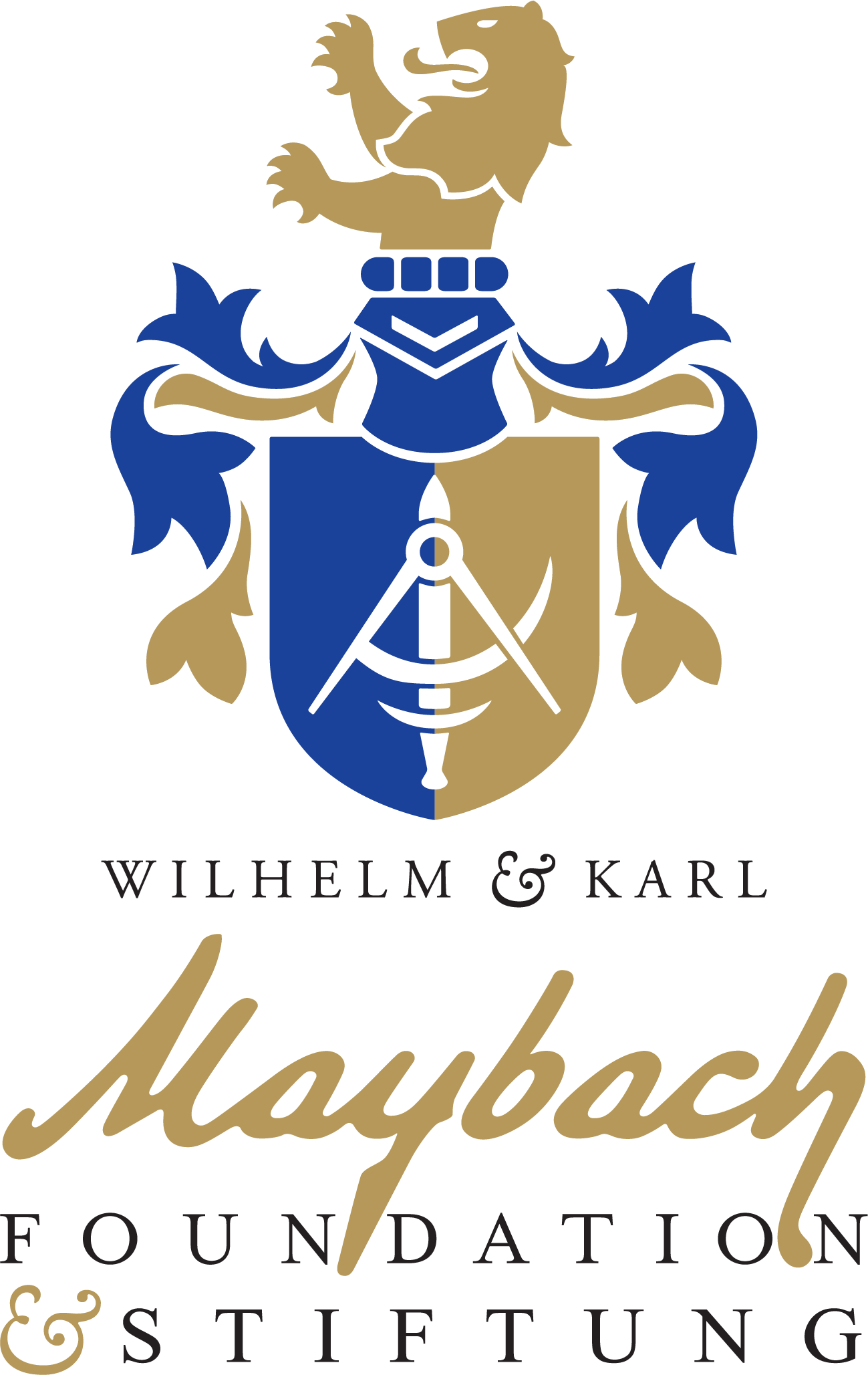
- Founded: 2005
- Founder: Ulrich Schmid-Maybach
- Type: 501(c)(3) Non-profit
- Purpose: Innovative Educational Approaches
- Location: San Francisco, California, United States
- Method: Donations, Private and Corporate Funding
- Website: www.maybach.org

The Wilhelm and Karl Maybach Foundation is a 501(c)(3) non-profit organization that seeks to showcase Maybach engineering and design heritage to inspire innovation. Formerly, the organization linked mentors with protégés worldwide, fostering and overseeing those relationships. However, they are now shifting focus to other programs in Germany, and working to restore a historic train.

The foundation has garnered famous supporters, many of whom credit mentoring with making a difference in their lives, including Kirk Douglas, Dennis Hopper, Paolo Coelho, Quincy Jones, and LeRoy Neiman.

The Maybach Foundation receives funding from multiple sources, including the Maybach Family. The foundation seeks most of its funding from donors and corporate partnerships from around the globe, including Daimler AG, the Maybach brand, and Silverstein Properties.

== History ==
The foundation is currently working with both their San Francisco and Stuttgart branches to focus on enhancing, celebrating, and sharing their heritage and tradition of innovation through their projects, additional mobile educational outreach, and design excellence for the next generation of technical innovators.

== Past Projects ==
The foundation marked each mentorship with a specific project that falls within a sector of interest. The general sectors of interest for the foundation are science and research; art, design and architecture; community and ethics; and business and technology.

=== Global Health Scholars Project ===
The pilot project for the mentoring program was led by Dr. David Bangsberg, M.D., a leader in HIV treatment strategies and founding dean at Portland State University School of Public Health, who mentored Dr. Conrad Muzoora, M.D., a Ugandan medical researcher, head of internal medicine at the Mbarara University of Science and Technology.

The two focused on working together from 2008 to 2013 in order to successfully research treatment options for patients with HIV/AIDS in addition to at least one other infectious disease like tuberculosis, and bring positive change by empowering the next generation of doctors and researchers who will remain in Uganda to fight life-threatening infectious diseases.

=== World Trade Center Documentary Arts Project ===
In a partnership between the Maybach Foundation and Silverstein Properties, four photographers were given the opportunity to document the rebuilding of the World Trade Center in New York City and be mentored by Joe Woolhead, the official photographer of the World Trade Center. The four photographers were Marika Asatiani (Tbilisi, Georgia), Benjamin Jarosch (New York, United States), Nicole Tung (New York, USA), and Vicky Roy (New Delhi, India). The goal of the project was for the proteges to become skilled documentary photographers, and produce a collection of images that capture the rebuilding of one of the US's most prominent landmarks, developing a generation of photographers who will raise awareness about political, cultural, and social issues.

=== Post-Apartheid Role Model Project ===
In October 2008, the foundation launched the Post-Apartheid Role Model Project (PARM) with the South African polo player, Sbu Duma, who was trained and mentored by international professionals in his field, the lead mentor being Argentinian polo player, Federico Bachman. Project locations included Argentina, Spain, France, Germany, and Great Britain. Tragically, Sbu Duma died in May 2012 before completing his mentorship but remains an inspiration to all who strive for individual greatness and wish to share their gifts with others.

=== Julian Schnabel--Vahakn Arslanian Arts Mentorship ===
Coinciding with the Venice Biennale 2011, the Maybach Foundation founded their art mentoring program, forming a collaborative mentorship between Julian Schnabel and Vahakn Arslanian, both New York-based artists. The goal of the mentorship project was to develop the creative potential of promising young artists who have overcome adversity and to use art to challenge the way we see the world and look to the future, these two were chosen because they were kindred spirits aiming to break down the prevailing aesthetic and establish a new way of seeing, much in the way of the revolutionary work of Wilhelm Maybach and Gottlieb Daimler. With the assistance of Maybach, the two were able to work together using automobile parts in art pieces to create several exhibitions for the 2011 Venice Biennale, 2011 St. Moritz Art Masters Event, and a 2012 exhibition entitled Holy, Heavenly in the West Village, sponsored by the foundation, Maybach Manufaktur, and Vito Schnabel.

=== David LaChapelle--Garret Suhrie Photography Mentorship ===
The arts mentorship project paired promising young artistic talent with established leaders in the art world to highlight their creativity. Up-and-coming photographer Garret Suhrie was mentored by star photographer David LaChapelle as a means to motivate society to appreciate and preserve nature as a way to survive urban chaos, using art to challenge the way the natural world is viewed. Suhrie documented the decaying industrial facilities in his home city of Harrisburg, Pennsylvania, displaying the original sights hidden amongst the natural world. Suhrie's resulting works from the period were shown at the Maybach Center of Excellence Event in Stuttgart, Germany, where he donated two of his photographs to the Daimler Art Collection. In 2011, Suhrie was featured at the St. Moritz Art Walk.

=== Culinary Arts: Food Movement Leadership Project ===
Through this project, the Maybach Foundation paired Tessa Tricks, a post-graduate student in the anthropology of food from the UK, with Sarah Weiner and other leaders from the Seedling Projects organization. Tessa Tricks was nominated by Aine Morris of the Sustainable Food Trust organization in the UK for her exceptional resume and experience in the Slow Food movement. The project allowed Tricks to forge relationships for future collaboration, investigate examples of best practices from the USA sustainable food movement, and help organize the 2014 Good Food Awards with her mentor.

=== Culinary Arts: Sustainable Fishing ===
After earning her master's degree in Public Administration from Cornell University and becoming active in the Maine Seafood Marketing Network, Amanda LaBelle was mentored by Monique Coombs, the director of Marine Programs for the Maine Coast Fishermen's Association. The program explored opportunities for integrating seafood into Maine's local food systems and bridged the gap between agriculture and fisheries in Maine.
