= Maybach =

German luxury car brand

- Type: Subsidiary (GmbH)
- Industry: Automotive
- Founded: 1909; 117 years ago
- Founder: Wilhelm Maybach
- Defunct: 1960 (bought by Daimler-Benz); 2013 (as a standalone brand)
- Fate: 1960: bought by Daimler-Benz; 2002: standalone brand 2015: Mercedes sub-brand
- Successor: Mercedes-Maybach
- Headquarters: Stuttgart, Germany
- Products: Luxury vehicles
- Parent: Mercedes-Benz
- Website: www.mercedes-benz.com/en/vehicles/mercedes-maybach/

Maybach (German: [ˈmaɪbax], MY-baakh) (Note: Frequently mispronounced by English speakers as /meɪbæk/ MAY-back.) is a German luxury car brand owned by Mercedes-Benz. The original company was founded in 1909 by Wilhelm Maybach and his son Karl Maybach, originally as a subsidiary of Luftschiffbau Zeppelin GmbH, and it was known as Luftfahrzeug-Motorenbau GmbH until 1999.

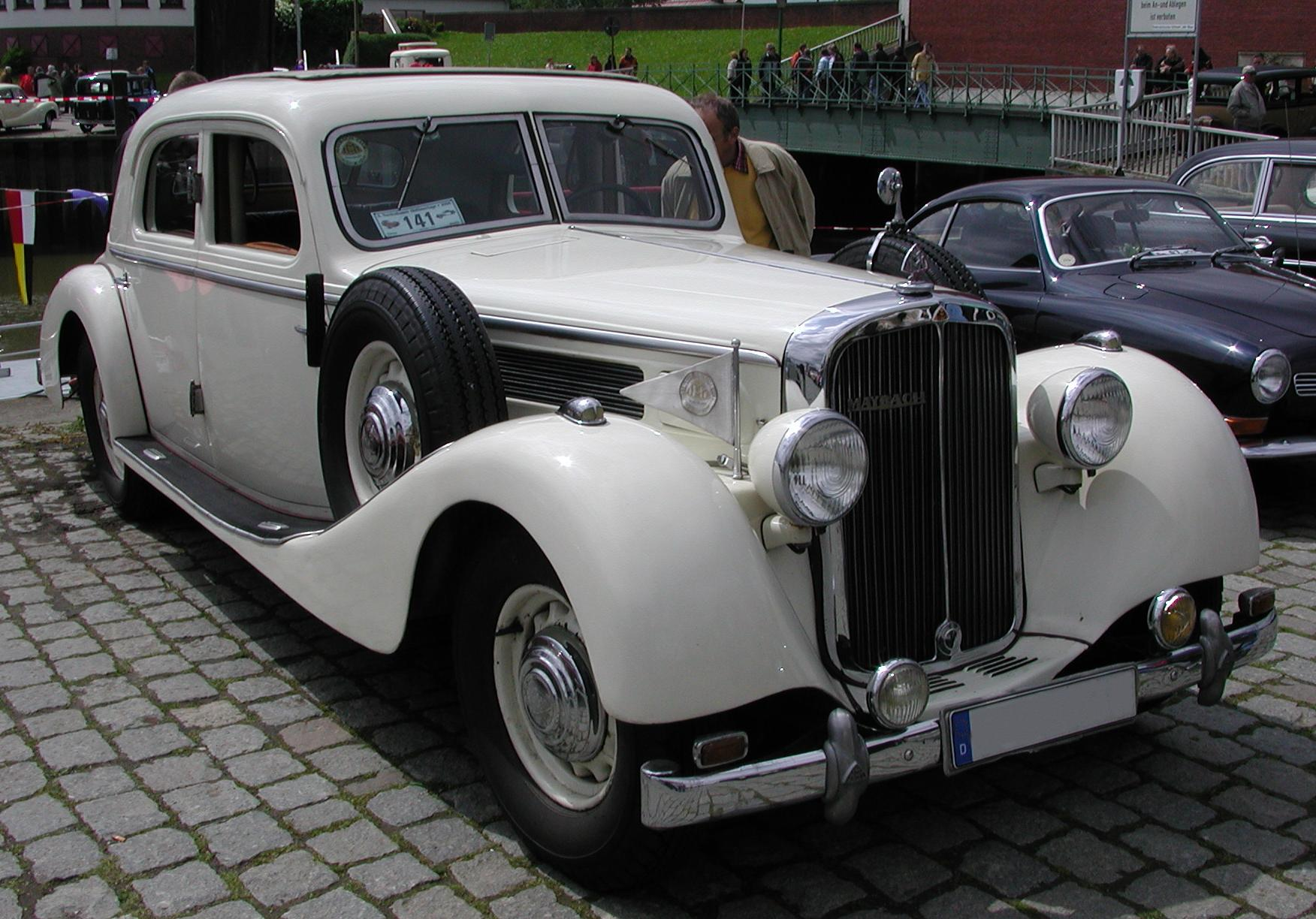
Maybach SW 42, 1939

In 1960, Maybach was acquired by Daimler-Benz. The name returned as a standalone ultra-luxury car brand in 2002, sharing significant components with Mercedes-Benz cars. In 2013, after slow sales, Maybach ceased to be a standalone brand. In 2015, it became a sub-brand of Mercedes-Benz, which the Mercedes-Benz Group owns. As of 2021, Daimler produces an ultra-luxury edition of the Mercedes-Benz S-Class, the Mercedes-Benz EQS SUV, the Mercedes-Benz GLS-Class, and the Mercedes-Benz SL under the Mercedes-Maybach name.

== 1909–1940: Early history ==
Wilhelm Maybach was the technical director of the Daimler-Motoren-Gesellschaft (DMG) until he left in 1907. On 23 March 1909, he founded the new company, Luftfahrzeug-Motorenbau GmbH (literally "Aircraft Engine Manufacturing Company"), with his son Karl Maybach as director. In 1912, they renamed it to Maybach-Motorenbau GmbH ("Maybach Engine Manufacturing Company"). Maybach originally developed and manufactured diesel and petrol engines for German Zeppelins, and then rail cars. Its Maybach Mb.IVa was used in German aircraft and airships of World War I.

In 1919, Maybach built an experimental car, introduced as a production model two years later at the Berlin Motor Show. Between 1921 and 1940, Maybach produced a variety of opulent vehicles, now regarded as classics. Maybach continued to build heavy-duty diesel engines for marine and rail purposes.

Maybach had a British subsidiary, Maybach Gears Ltd., that specialised in gearboxes. In 1938, in conjunction with Dr Henry Merritt, they produced a gearbox and steering system – the 'Merritt-Maybach' – for the abortive Nuffield A.16E1 Cruiser tank design.

== 1940–1945 ==
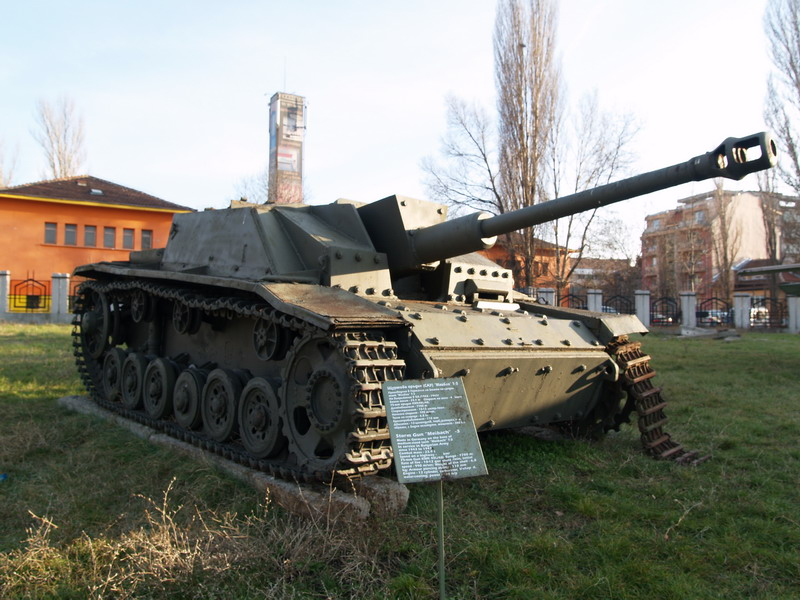
A captured Sturmgeschütz III assault gun, derived from the Panzer III medium tank, with a Maybach engine, at the Bulgarian National Museum of Military History

During the Second World War, Maybach produced the engines for most of Nazi Germany's tanks and half-tracks. These included almost all the production tank engines for the Panzer I, II, III, IV and V, the Tiger I and II (Maybach HL230) and other heavy tanks. Maybach built engines for half-tracks such as the Sd.Kfz. 251 personnel carrier and prime movers like the Sd.Kfz. 9. The engine plant was one of several industries targeted by allied bombers at Friedrichshafen, leading to the establishment of an underground factory (codenamed "Richard I") under Radobýl mountain in Central Bohemia.

After WWII, the factory performed some repair work, but automotive production was never restarted. Some 20 years later, Maybach was renamed MTU Friedrichshafen.

== 1960s ==
Daimler-Benz purchased the company in 1960. Post-1960, the company was mainly used to make special editions of Mercedes cars in the W108 and W116 model range, which were virtually hand built. These cars carried the Mercedes badge and serial numbers.

Rolls-Royce Power Systems AG, based in Friedrichshafen, used to manufacture the commercial Maybach diesel engines under the MTU brand through its subsidiary MTU Friedrichshafen GmbH.

== 1997–2013 ==
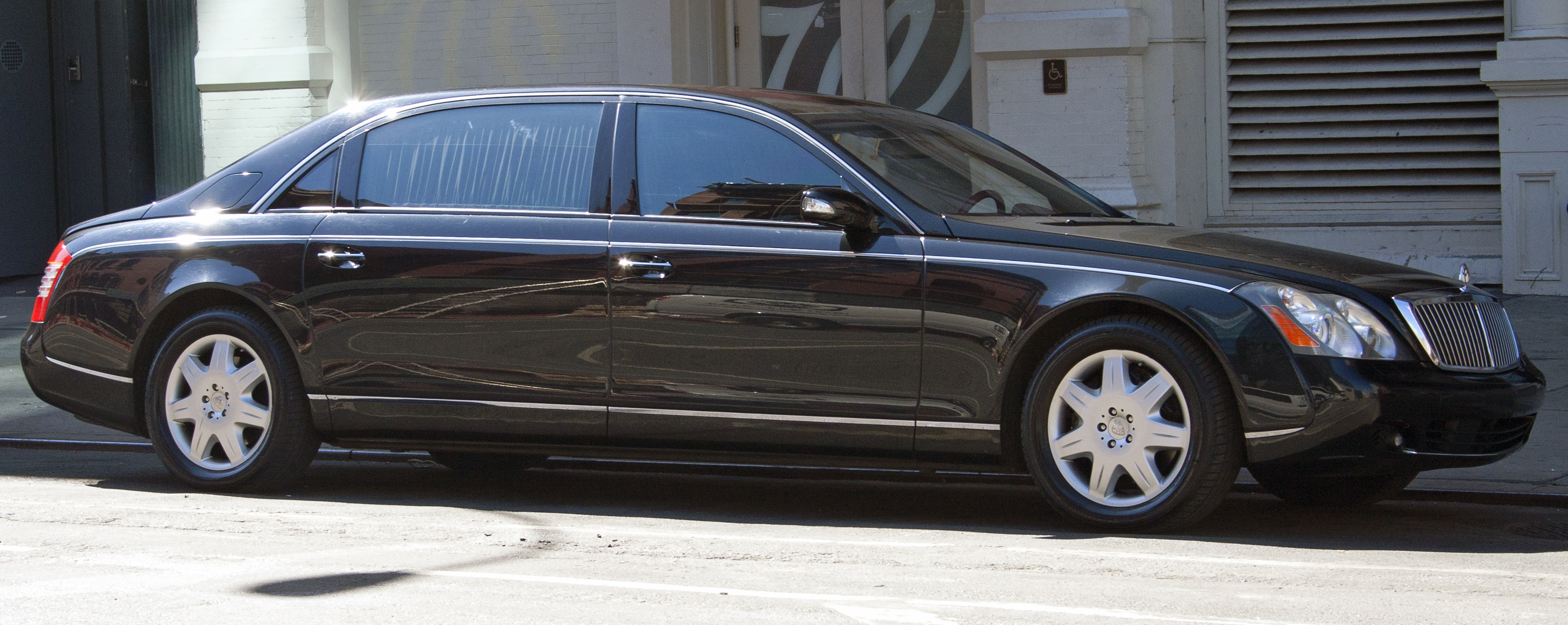
Maybach 62

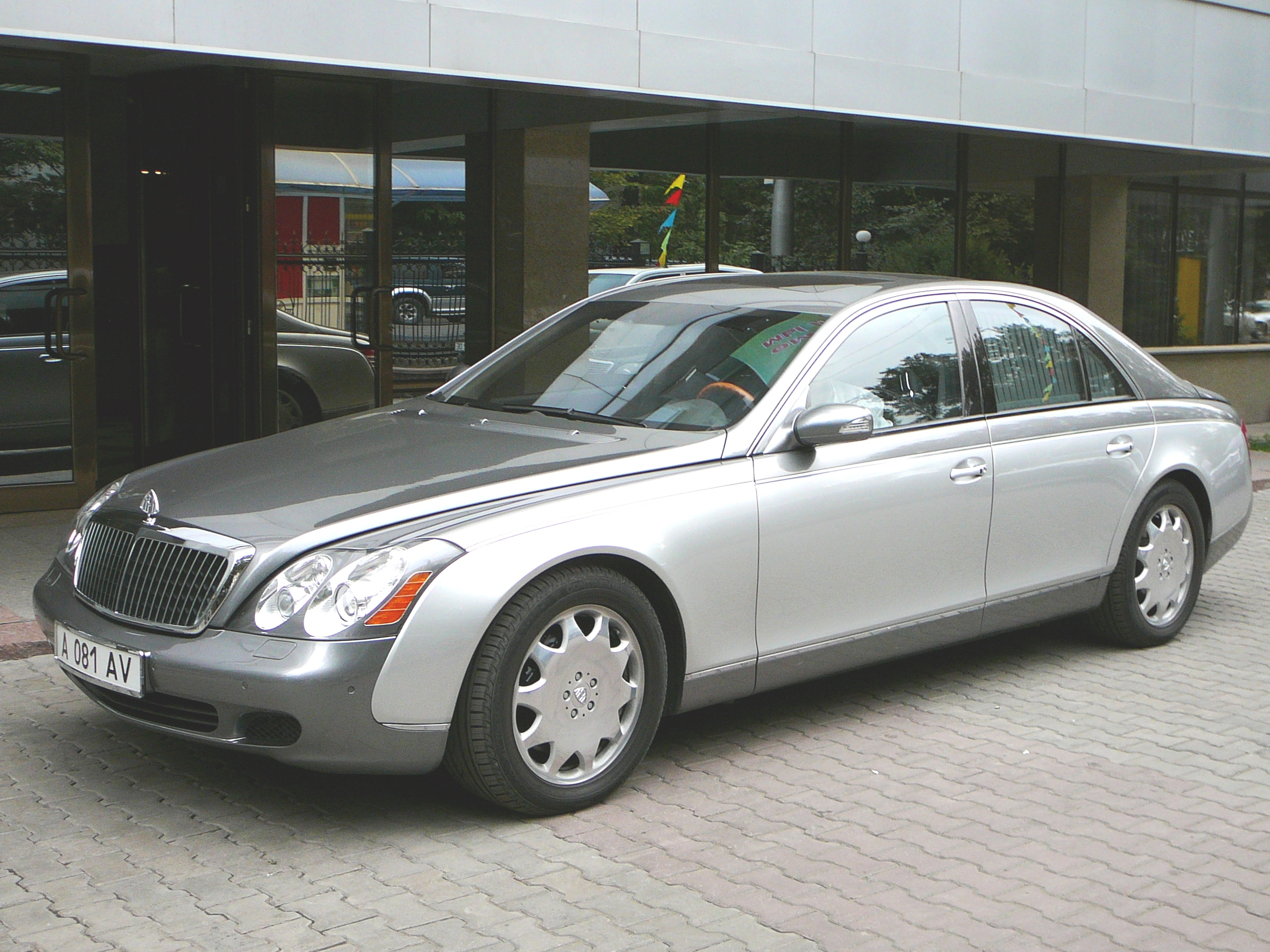
Maybach 57

Daimler presented a luxury concept car at the 1997 Tokyo Motor Show. A production model based on it was introduced in two sizes – the Maybach 57 and the Maybach 62, reflecting the lengths of the automobiles in decimetres. In 2005, the 57S was added, powered by a 6.0 L V12 bi-turbo engine producing 450 kW (603 hp) and 1,000 N⋅m (738 lbf⋅ft) of torque, and featuring cosmetic touches.

To promote the new Maybach line, Mercedes-Benz engaged figures such as Maybach heir Ulrich Schmid-Maybach and golfer Nick Faldo to serve as brand ambassadors.

Initially, Daimler-Chrysler predicted annual sales of 2,000 worldwide with 50 percent coming from the United States. These expectations never materialized. In 2007, Mercedes bought back 29 US dealers, reducing the total from 71 to 42.

In 2010, only 157 Maybachs were sold worldwide, compared to 2,711 similarly priced Rolls-Royces. By the time of the announcement that the brand was to be laid back to rest, 3,000 had been sold worldwide since the brand was revived in 2002.

In November 2011, Daimler announced that Maybach would cease to be a brand by 2013 and manufactured the last Maybach vehicle in December 2012. This was because of poor sales.

=== Cancellation ===
With poor sales and the heavy impact of the 2008 financial crisis, Daimler AG undertook a complete review of the Maybach division, approaching Aston Martin to engineer and style the next generation of Maybach models along with the next generation of Lagondas. According to Automotive News, only 44 Maybachs were sold in the US in the first ten months of 2011.

An article in Fortune noted that Mercedes had missed out on the chance to purchase Rolls-Royce and Bentley when they were up for sale in the 1990s:

Mercedes backpedaled and decided it needed to be in the ultra-luxury business too, but it went after it in a remarkably clumsy way.

It stated that the first Maybach models had poor driving dynamics compared to its contemporaries from Rolls-Royce and Bentley.

Mercedes took an aging S-class chassis and plopped an absurdly elongated body on it ... rather than develop a new car from the wheels up, as BMW did with Rolls-Royce, or cleverly use the underpinnings of an existing model like the Volkswagen Phaeton for a new Bentley.

Maybachs were never advertised as owner-driven vehicles, as the company believed that the luxury amenities would be sufficient to drive sales, and they even insisted that auto journalists, who usually test drive the vehicle, ride in the back seat.

Another suggestion for Maybach's struggles was that parent Daimler had failed to differentiate it from its Mercedes-Benz brand. While all three ultra-luxury marques share platforms and engines with other luxury brands from their parent auto company, Maybachs are built alongside the Mercedes-Benz S-Class flagship sedan, whereas Rolls-Royce and Bentley are assembled in England, separate from the rest of BMW and Volkswagen Group's respective production plants, and thus are regarded as being more "exclusive". Furthermore, the Maybach's pedigree was virtually unknown outside of Germany, unlike its British rivals which have long enjoyed renown worldwide. The 2006 Rolls-Royce Phantom's interior evokes memories of a 1930s car, while the Maybach 57S's inside makes no reference to its marque's history.

In November 2011, Daimler's CEO Dieter Zetsche announced that the Maybach-brand would cease to exist in 2012, making room for other models of the Mercedes-Benz S-Class. The Maybach-limousines were still being sold up to 2013, but after that, the name "Maybach" would not be used. In August 2012, parent Daimler AG announced the official discontinuation of Maybach by releasing a price sheet discontinuing the Maybach 57, 57S, 62, 62S and Landaulet. On 17 December 2012, the last Maybach vehicle was manufactured in Sindelfingen.

== 2015–present ==
=== Revival ===
The company announced that the line would be replaced by the next-generation of the Mercedes-Benz S-Class, Model W222, due for the 2014 model year, particularly the long wheelbase S-Class Pullman. An executive told a Frankfurt newspaper that "Daimler came to the conclusion that the sales chances for the Mercedes brand were better than that of Maybach."

=== Mercedes-Maybach ===
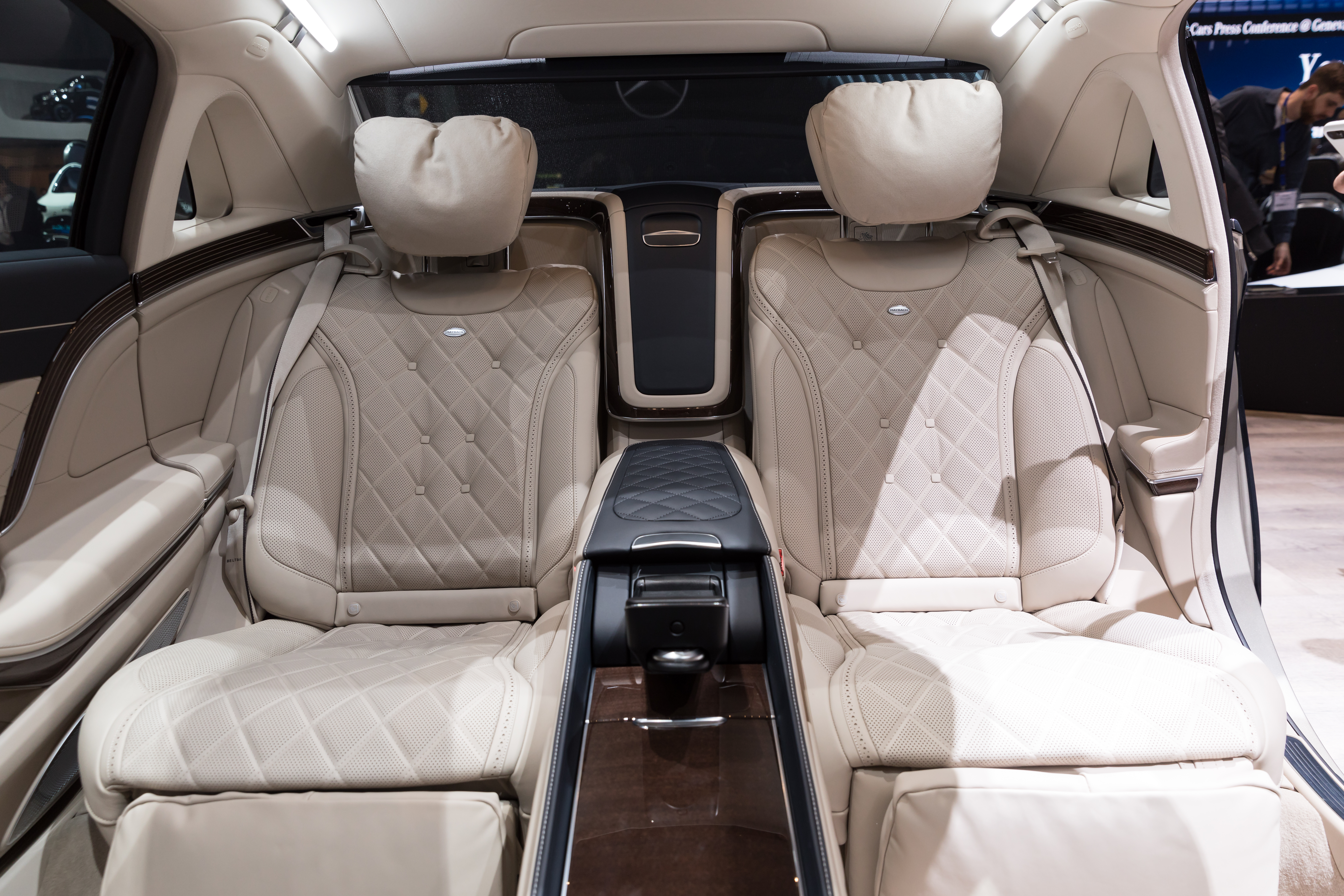
Rear seats of a Mercedes-Maybach S 650

In November 2014, Daimler announced the revival of the Maybach name as a sub-brand of the Mercedes-Benz S-Class (W222), known internally as the model X222 platform, positioned as an upscale version akin to the more sporty Mercedes-AMG sub-brand. In anticipation of its April 2015 launch, the flagship Mercedes-Maybach S600 was unveiled at car shows in Los Angeles, United States, and Guangzhou, China, and the production model at the 2015 Geneva Motor Show. The X222 lineup received a mid-life facelift for model 2018. The V8 variant S550 was renamed to the S560. The V12 variant S600 flagship model was renamed the S650, known as S680 in the Chinese market.

Assembled on the same Sindelfingen line used for the S-Class, the model is targeted against the Bentley Mulsanne and Rolls-Royce Phantom. At 5.453 metres (17.89 ft) long with a wheelbase of 3.365 metres (11.04 ft) (132.5 inches), it is approximately 20 centimetres (7.9 in) longer than the long-wheelbase S-Class models. The Mercedes-Maybach will be available as S500 (S550 in the US) and S600 models, with 4matic all-wheel-drive optional with the V8 engine. Acceleration is 0 to 60 miles per hour (0 to 97 km/h) in 5.0 seconds.

The base car has several colour finish options and the choice between a three-seat rear bench, or two seats reclining. Options include: air-conditioned, heated and massaging seats; heated armrests; a system to pump scented, ionised air around the cabin; and a 1540 watt Burmester 3D surround sound system with 24 speakers. Maybach S500 assembly in Pune, India, began in September 2015, making India the second country to produce a Maybach.

Since September 2020, the MBUSI plant in Vance, Alabama, has produced the Mercedes-Maybach GLS 600.

=== Concept cars ===
The first Mercedes-Maybach concept car is the Vision Mercedes-Maybach 6, a large two-door coupe with a fully electric drivetrain. The model was unveiled at the 2016 Pebble Beach Concours d'Elegance.

== Models ==
=== Pre-war ===
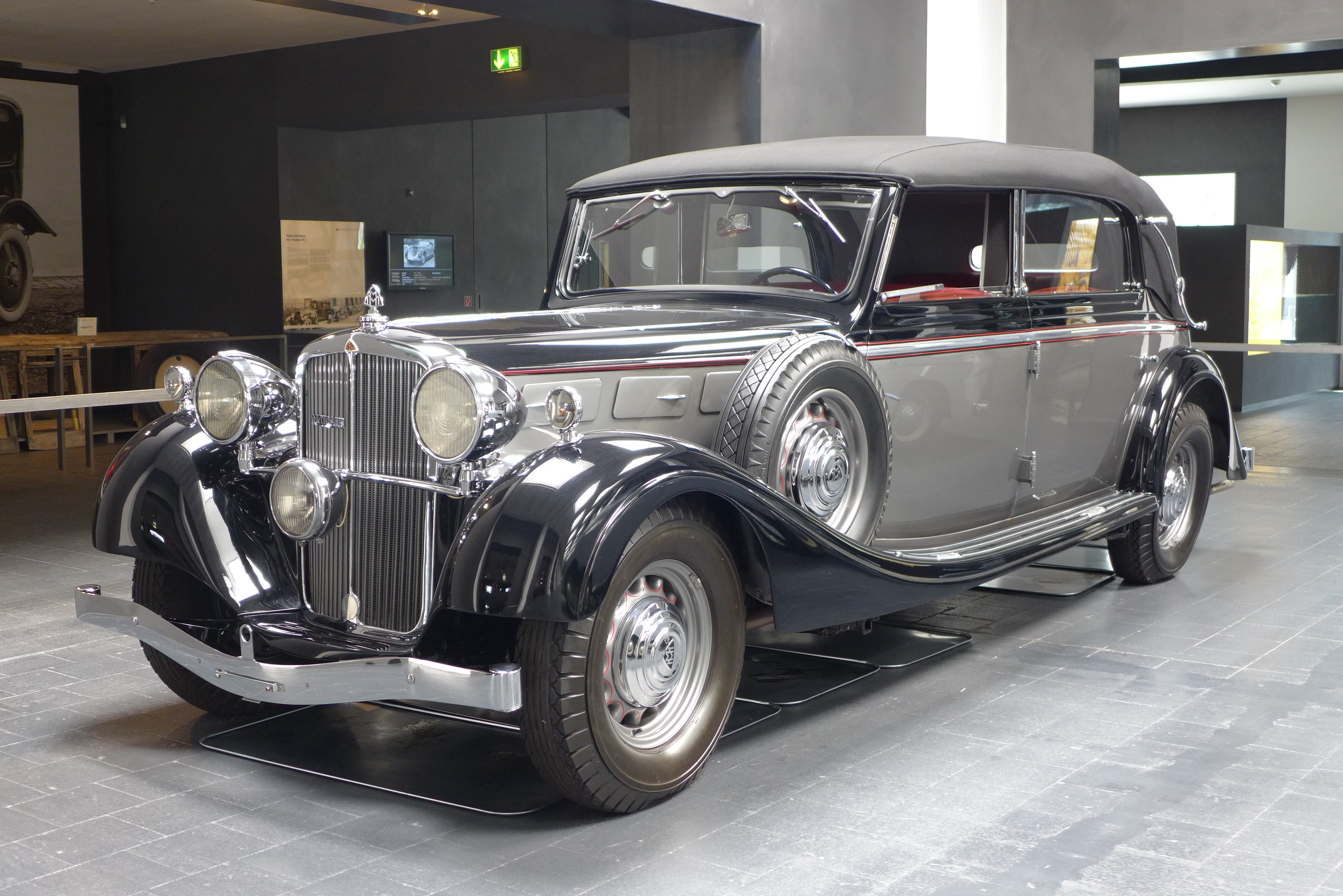
A 1937 Maybach SW 38

- 1919 Maybach W1: Test car based on a DMG chassis
- 1921 Maybach W3: First Maybach, shown at Berlin Motor Show. Featured a 70 hp (52 kW) 5.7L inline six.
- 1926 Maybach W5: 7L inline six, 120 hp (89 kW)
- 1929 Maybach 12: V12 precursor to DS7/8
- 1930 Maybach DSH: Doppel-Sechs-Halbe ("half a twelve cylinder") 1930–1937
- 1930 Maybach DS7 Zeppelin: 7L V12, 150 hp (112 kW)
- 1931 Maybach W6: Same engine as W5, longer wheelbase. 1931–1933
- 1931 Maybach DS8 Zeppelin: 8L V12, 200 hp (150 kW)
- 1934 Maybach W6 DSG: Featuring a twin overdrive transmission system
- 1935 Maybach SW35: 3.5L 140 hp (104 kW) I6
- 1936 Maybach SW38: 3.8L 140 hp (104 kW) I6
- 1939 Maybach SW42: 4.2L 140 hp (104 kW) I6
- 1945 Maybach JW61: 3.8L 145 hp (108 kW) I6

2 were the 5.7 L inline six engines built for and ordered by Spyker. Not all were purchased, and Karl had to build cars featuring the engines to offset costs.

Around 1800 Maybachs were built before WWII.

=== Engines ===
- Maybach HL120
- Maybach HL116
- Maybach HL210
- Maybach HL230

=== Post-revival ===
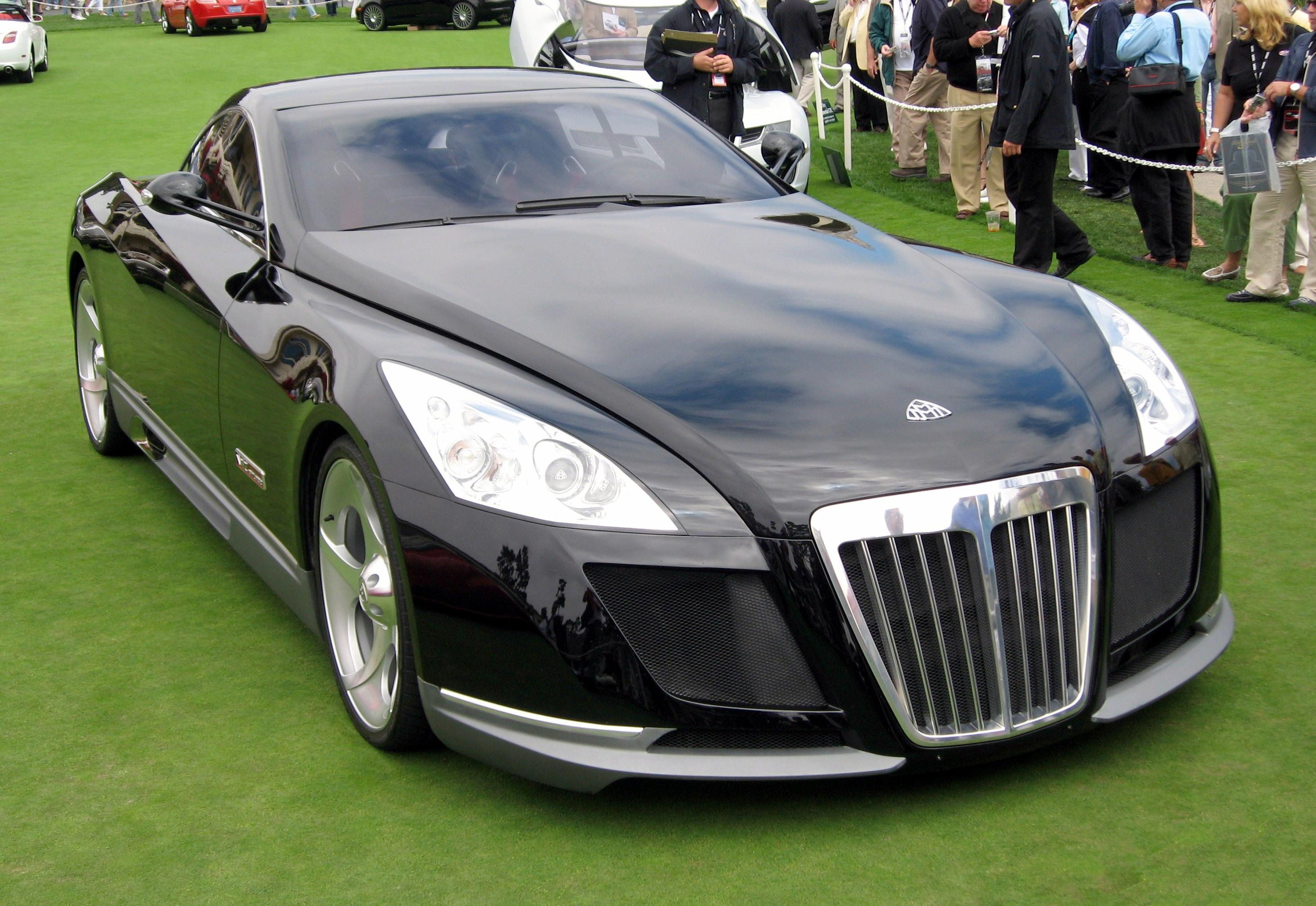
Maybach Exelero at the Concours d'Elegance

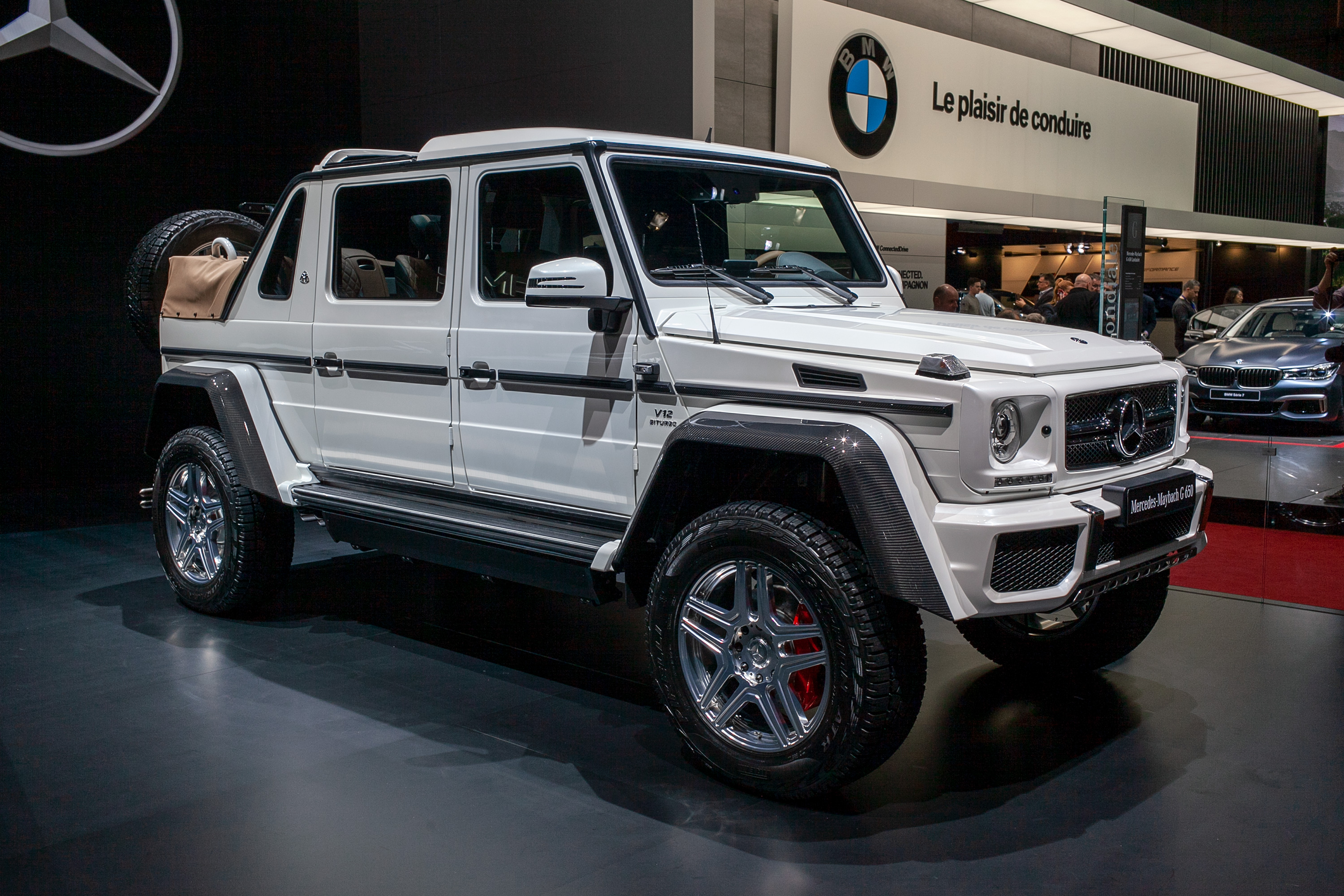
Mercedes-Maybach G 650 Landaulet at Geneve Motor Show 2017

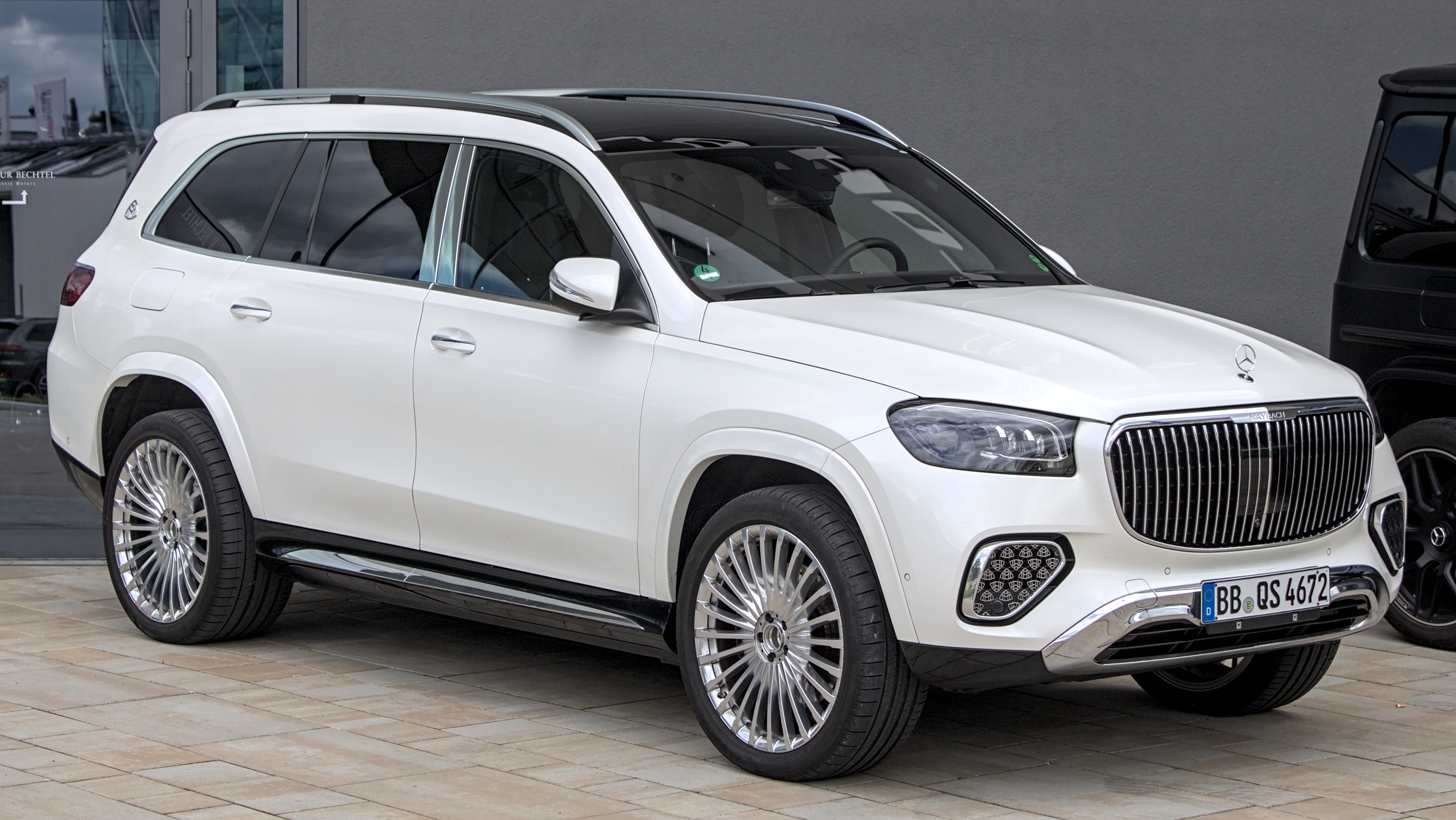
2024 Mercedes-Maybach GLS 600

- 2002 Maybach 57 and 62
- 2005 Maybach Exelero (prototype shown at the IAA in Frankfurt)
- 2005 Maybach 57S (the S standing for Special rather than Sport)
- 2006 Maybach 62S
- 2007 Maybach 62 Landaulet
- 2009 Maybach 57 and 62 "Zeppelin"
- 2011 Maybach Guard
- 2014 Mercedes-Maybach S600
- 2014 Mercedes-Maybach S400 (only for China)
- 2015 Mercedes-Maybach S500/S550 (US)
- 2015 Mercedes-Maybach S600 Pullman
- 2016 Mercedes-Maybach S 650 Cabriolet
- 2017 Mercedes-Maybach S560
- 2017 Mercedes-Maybach S650
- 2017 Mercedes-Maybach S680 (renamed S650 only for China)
- 2017 Mercedes-Maybach G 650 Landaulet
- 2019 Mercedes-Maybach GLS600
- 2021 Mercedes-Maybach S480 (only for China)
- 2021 Mercedes-Maybach S580
- 2021 Mercedes-Maybach S680
- 2023 Mercedes-Maybach EQS680 SUV
- 2023 Mercedes Maybach "Project Maybach" – Abloh collaborated with Mercedes Benz's chief designer on Project Maybach. The partnership produced two unique Maybach vehicles: a massive, solar powered roadster designed for luxury off-roading, and a reimagined S680. The roadster remains under “show car” status, but the Virgil Abloh Maybach S680 was available to purchase in April 2023. Abloh died from cancer in 2021.
- 2025 Mercedes-Maybach SL580
- 2025 Mercedes-Maybach SL680

== Sales ==
Calendar year	US sales
2003	166
2004	244
2005	152
2006	146
2007	156
2008	119
2009	66
2010	63
2022	21,600 (Global Sales)

In November 2020, Daimler announced that it planned to double its Maybach sales, based on strong Chinese demand, where the car is used as a limousine.

== See also ==
- List of German car manufacturers
- Maybach Foundation
- Maybach I and II, two World War II bunker complexes named after the engines
- Museum for Historical Maybach Vehicles
