= Museum for Historical Maybach Vehicles =

- Museum für historische Maybach-Fahrzeuge
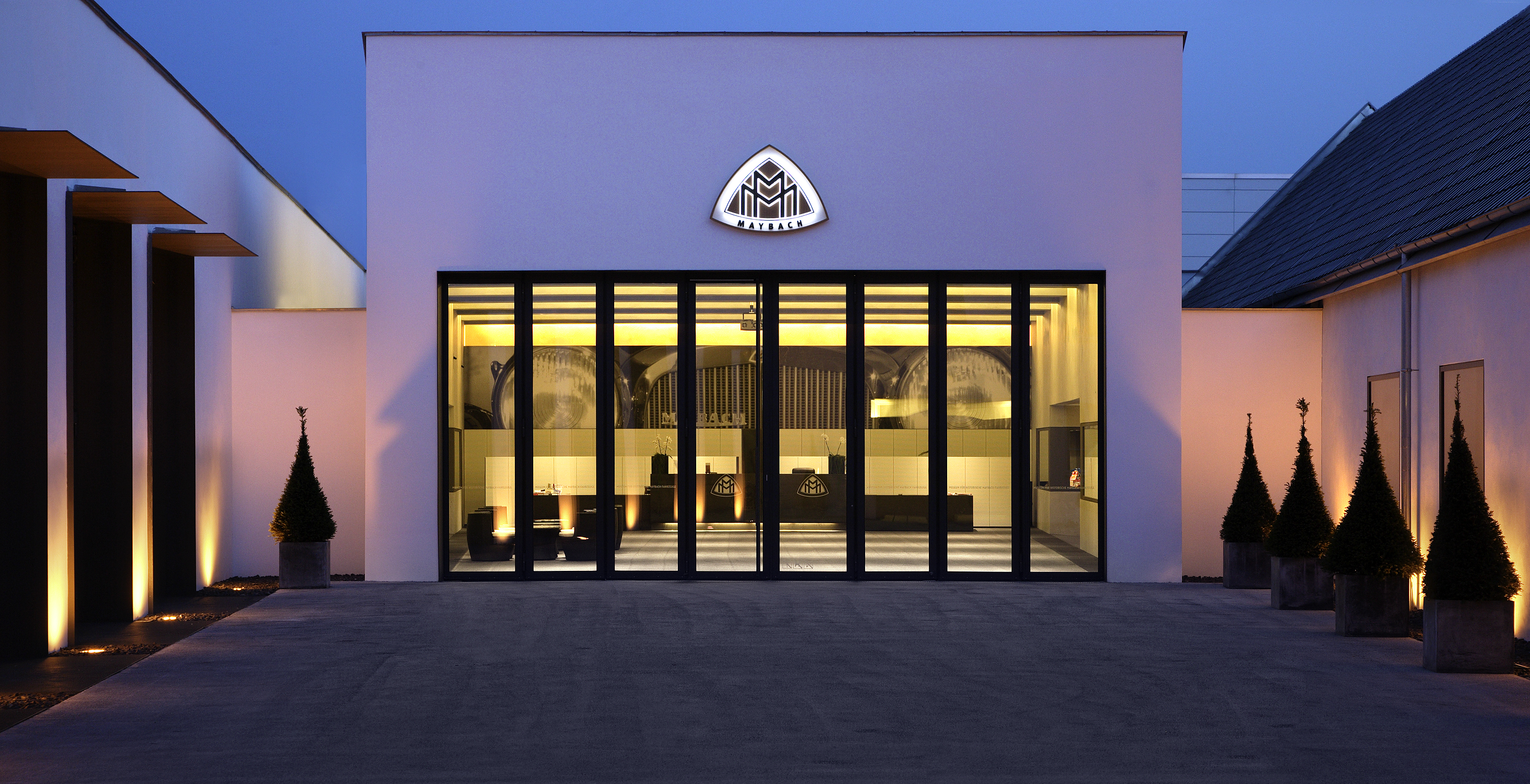
- The museum courtyard.

- Location within Bavaria
- Established: 2009; 17 years ago
- Location: Holzgartenstraße 8; 92318 Neumarkt; Germany
- Coordinates: 49°16′25″N 11°27′36″E
- Type: Automobile museum
- Website: Museum for Historical Maybach Vehicles

The Museum for Historical Maybach Vehicles (German: Museum für historische Maybach-Fahrzeuge) is a privately owned automobile museum in Neumarkt in der Oberpfalz, Bavaria, Germany. Opened in 2009, it is the first and only museum in the world to be devoted exclusively to the Maybach brand of automobiles.

== See also ==
- Automuseum Dr. Carl Benz
- List of automobile museums
- Mercedes-Benz Museum
