= Carl Benz =

German designer and engineer (1844–1929)

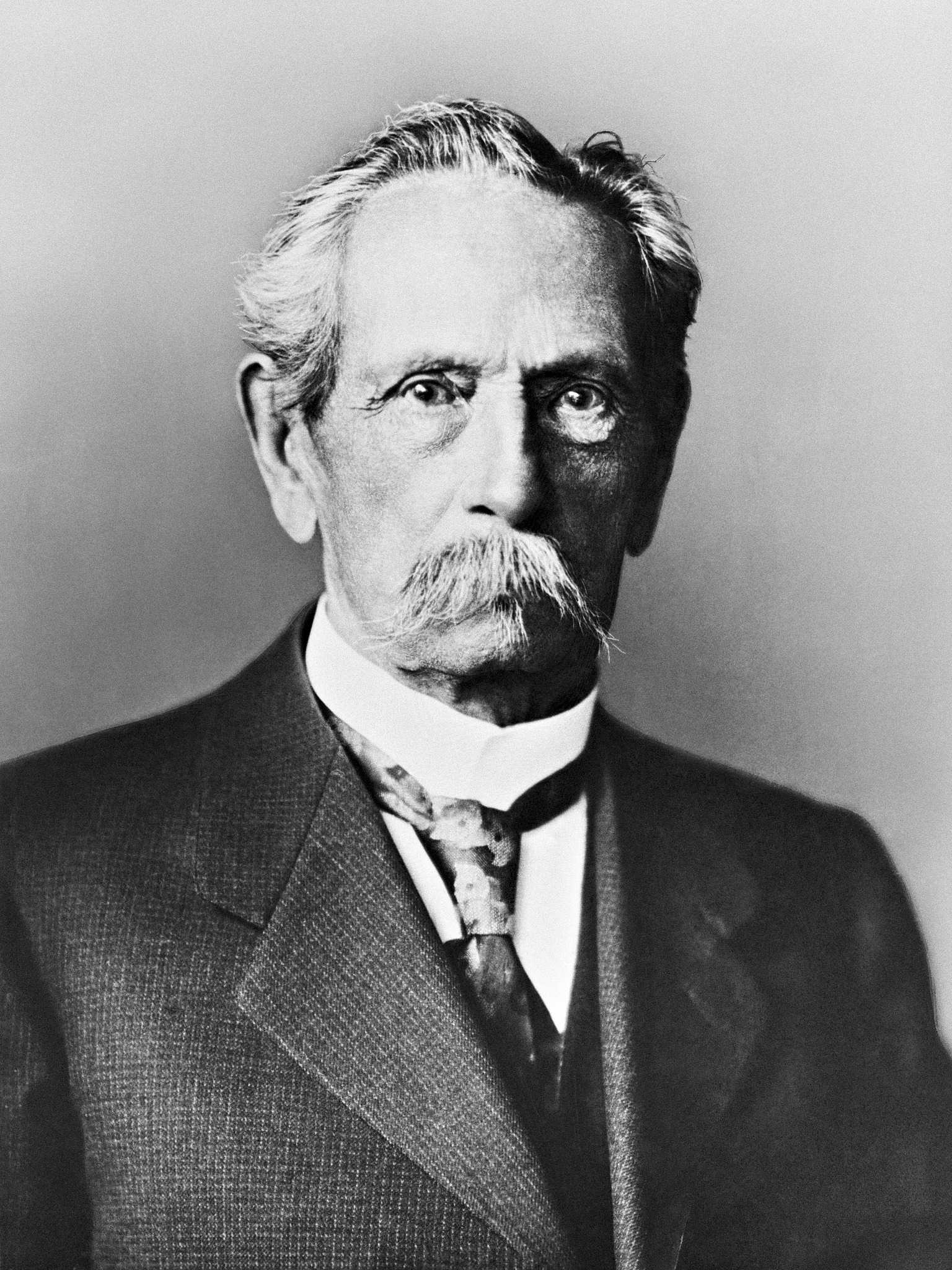
- Benz c. 1920
- Born: Karl Friedrich Michael Vaillant; 25 November 1844; Mühlburg, Baden, German Confederation (now Karlsruhe, Baden-Württemberg, Germany)
- Died: 4 April 1929 (aged 84); Ladenburg, Baden, Weimar Republic
- Resting place: Cemetery of Ladenburg
- Education: University of Karlsruhe
- Spouse: Bertha Ringer (m. 1872)
- Children: 5
- Engineering career
- Projects: Founded Fabrik für Maschinen zur Blechbearbeitung, Gasmotorenfabrik in Mannheim A. G., Benz & Cie.
- Significant design: Benz Patent-Motorwagen
- Significant advance: Automobile

Signature
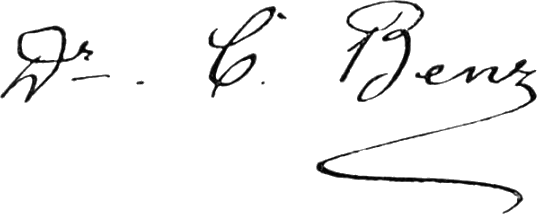

Carl (or Karl) Friedrich Benz (German: [kaʁl ˈfʁiːdʁɪç ˈbɛnts]; born Karl Friedrich Michael Vaillant; 25 November 1844 – 4 April 1929) was a German engine designer and automotive engineer. His Benz Patent-Motorwagen from 1885 is considered the first practical, modern automobile and the first car to be put into series production. He received a patent for the motorcar in 1886, the same year he first publicly drove the Benz Patent-Motorwagen.

His company Benz & Cie., based in Mannheim, was the world's first automobile plant and largest of its day. In 1926, it merged with Daimler Motoren Gesellschaft to form Daimler-Benz, which produces the Mercedes-Benz among other brands.

For his achievements, Benz is widely regarded as "the father of the car", and as the "father of the automobile industry".

== Early life ==
Carl Benz was born Karl Friedrich Michael Vaillant on 25 November 1844 in Mühlburg, Grand-Duchy of Baden, today a part of Karlsruhe, Baden-Württemberg, Germany. His presumed birth house is remembered with a memorial at Rheinstraße 22, although the original building was demolished in the 1950s to make way for additional car lanes. He was the "illegitimate" child of Josephine Vaillant and Johann Georg Benz, a locomotive driver, whom she married a few months later. According to German law, the child acquired the name "Benz" by legal marriage of his parents. When he was two years old, his father died of pneumonia, and his name was changed to Karl Friedrich Benz in remembrance of his father. The Benz family was Lutheran in faith.

Despite living in near poverty, his mother strove to give him a good education. Benz attended the local school in Karlsruhe and was a prodigious student. In 1853, at the age of nine, he started at the scientifically oriented Lyceum. After he graduated, he studied at Karlsruhe's polytechnical school under the instruction of Ferdinand Redtenbacher.

Benz had originally focused his studies on locksmithing, but he eventually followed his father's steps toward locomotive engineering. On 30 September 1860, at age 15, he passed the entrance exam for mechanical engineering for the Karlsruhe polytechnical school, which he subsequently attended. Benz graduated on 9 July 1864, aged 19.

Following his formal education, Benz had seven years of professional training in several companies, but did not fit well in any of them. The training started in Karlsruhe with two years of varied jobs in a mechanical engineering company.

He then moved to Mannheim to work as a draftsman and designer in a scales factory. In 1868, he went to Pforzheim to work for the bridge building company Gebrüder Benckiser Eisenwerke und Maschinenfabrik. He later went to Vienna for a short period to work at an iron construction company.

== Benz's first factory and early inventions (1871–1882) ==
In 1871, Benz joined August Ritter, in launching the Iron Foundry and Mechanical Workshop in Mannheim, later renamed Factory for Machines for Sheet-metal Working.

The enterprise's first year went poorly. Ritter turned out to be unreliable, and the business's tools were impounded. The difficulty was overcome when Benz's fiancée, Bertha Ringer, bought out Ritter's share in the company, using her dowry.

On 20 July 1872, Benz and Bertha Ringer married at the St. Michael's Lutheran Castle Church in Pforzheim. They had five children: Eugen (1873), Richard (1874), Clara (1877), Thilde (1882), and Ellen (1890).

Despite the business misfortunes, Benz led in the development of new engines in the early factory he and his wife owned. To get more revenue, in 1878 he began to work on new patents. First, he concentrated on creating a reliable petrol two-stroke engine. Benz finished his two-stroke engine on 31 December 1879, and was granted a patent for it on 28 June 1880.

While designing what would become the production standard for his two-stroke engine, Benz patented the speed regulation system, the ignition using sparks with battery, the spark plug, the carburetor, the clutch, the gear shift, and the water radiator.

== Benz's Gasmotoren-Fabrik Mannheim (1882–1883) ==
Problems arose again when the banks at Mannheim demanded that the Benz's enterprise be incorporated due to the high production costs it maintained. They were forced to improvise an association with photographer Emil Bühler and his brother (a cheese merchant), to get additional bank support. The company became the joint-stock company Gasmotoren Fabrik Mannheim in 1882.

After all the necessary incorporation agreements, Benz was unhappy because he was left with merely five percent of the shares and a modest position as director. Worst of all, his ideas weren't considered when designing new products, so he withdrew from that corporation just one year later, in 1883.

== Benz and Cie. and the Benz Patent-Motorwagen ==
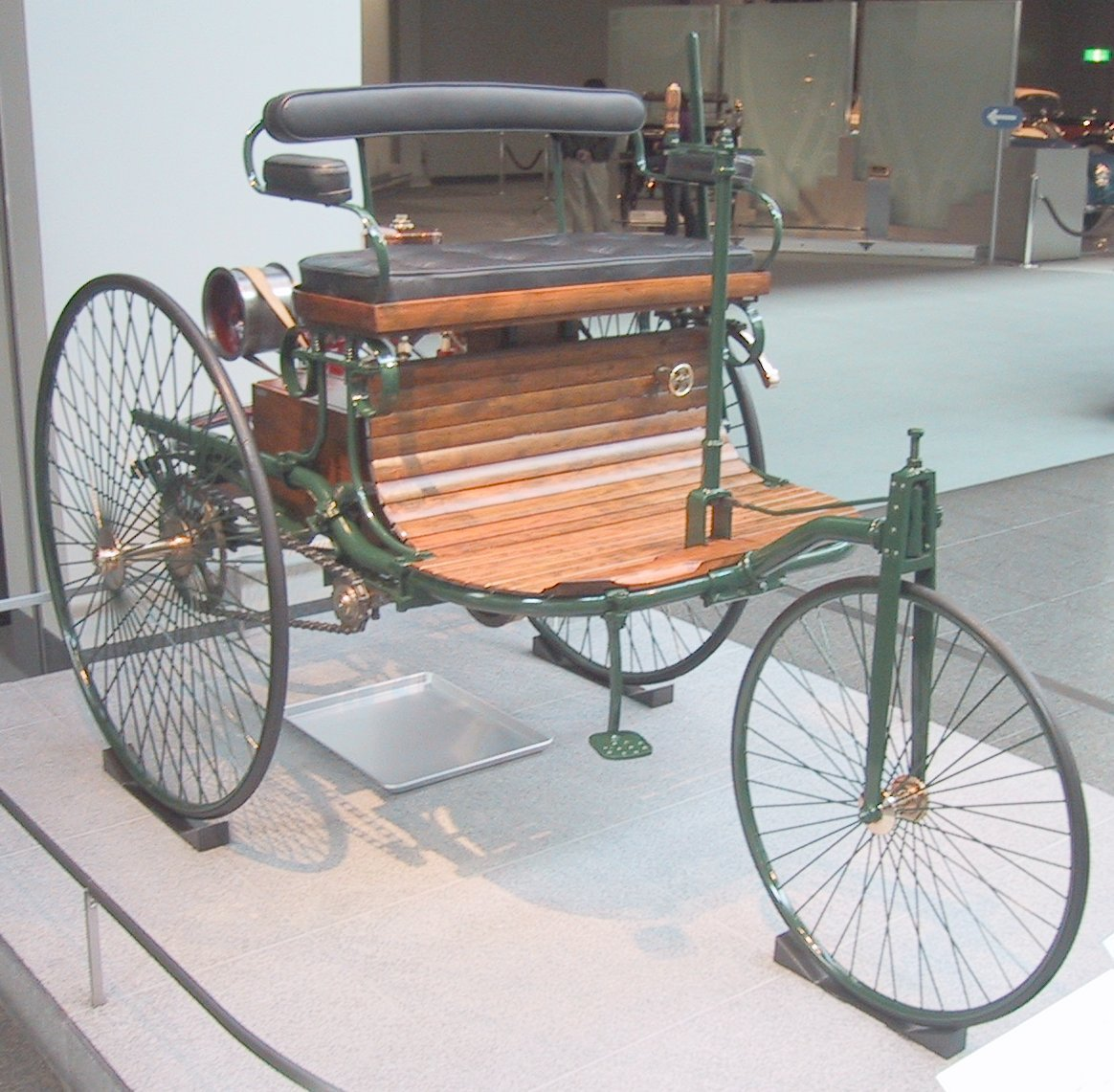
Replica of the Benz Patent-Motorwagen Nr. 1

1885 Benz Patent-Motorwagen

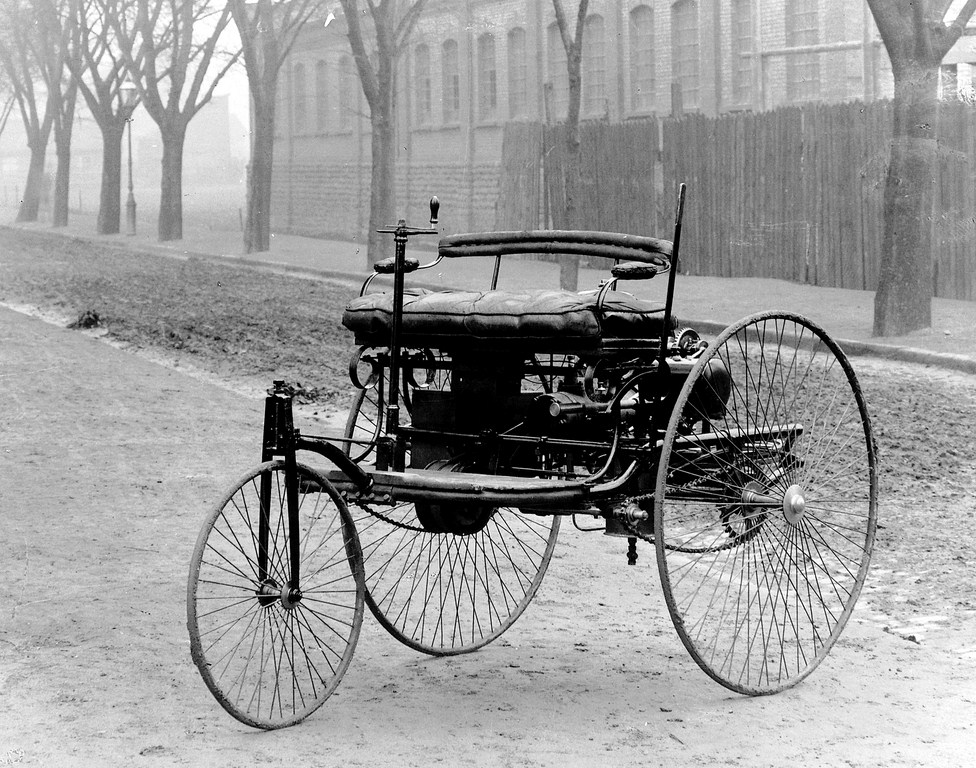

Three wheels
Tubular steel frame
Rack and pinion steering, connected to a driver end tiller; wheel chained to front axle
Electric ignition
Differential rear end gears

(mechanically operated inlet valves)

Water-cooled internal combustion engine
Gas or petrol four-stroke horizontally mounted engine
Single cylinder, bore 116 mm, stroke 160 mm
Patent model: 958 cc, 0.8 hp, 16 km/h (9.9 mph)
Commercialized model: 1600 cc, 3/4 hp, 13 km/h (8.1 mph)

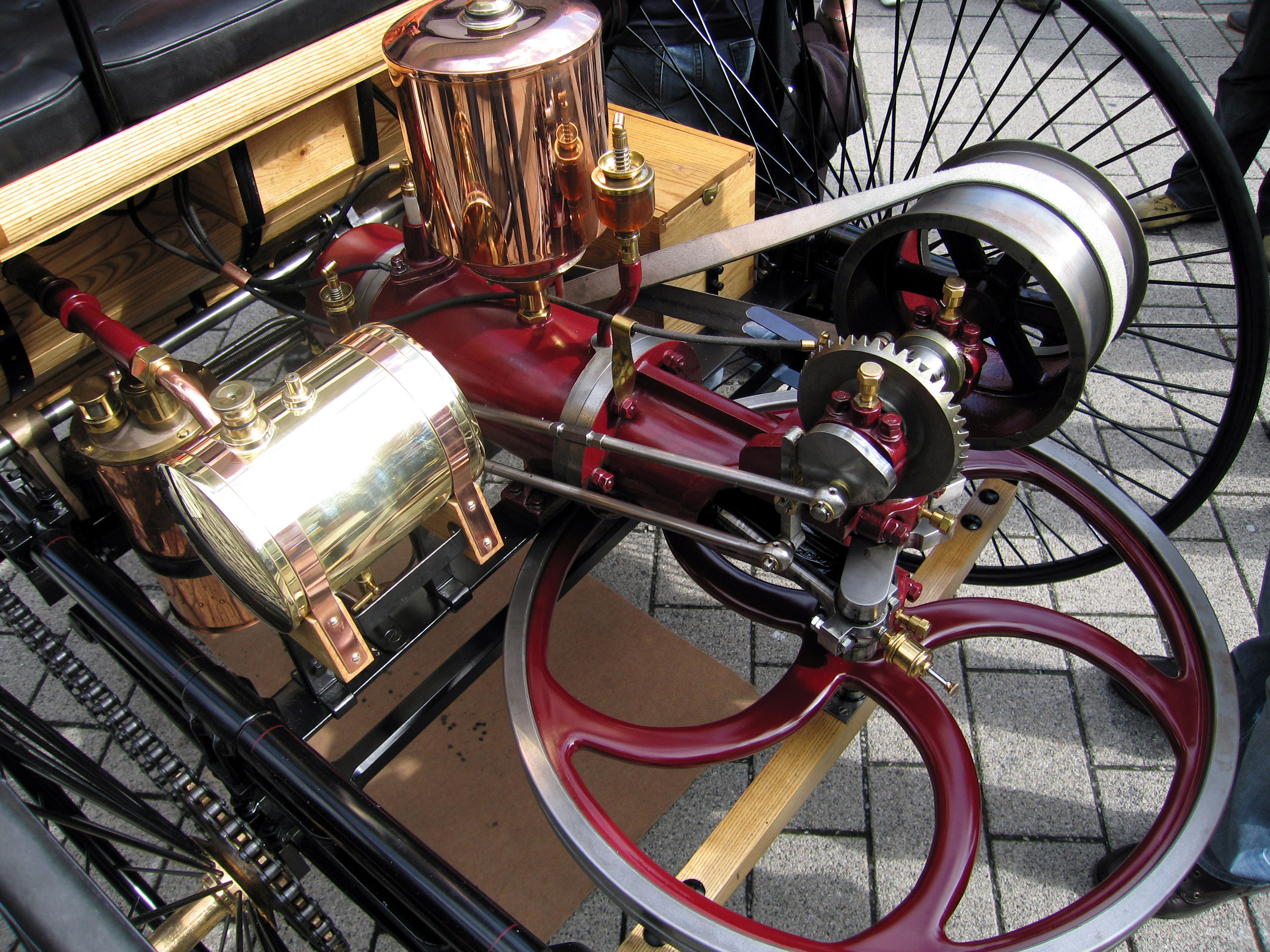
Engine of a replica of the Benz Patent-Motorwagen Nr. 1

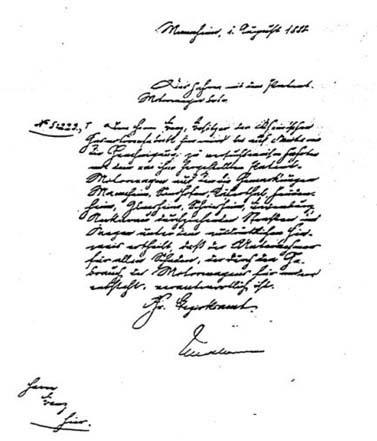
An official license to operate the Benz Patent-Motorwagen on the public roads was issued by Großherzoglich Badisches Bezirksamt on 1 August 1888

Benz's lifelong hobby brought him to a bicycle repair shop in Mannheim owned by Max Rose and Friedrich Wilhelm Eßlinger. In 1883, the three founded a new company producing industrial machines: Benz & Companie Rheinische Gasmotoren-Fabrik, usually referred to as Benz & Cie. Quickly growing to twenty-five employees, it soon began to produce static gas engines as well.

The success of the company gave Benz the opportunity to indulge in his old passion of designing a horseless carriage. Based on his experience with, and fondness for, bicycles, he used similar technology when he created an automobile. It featured wire wheels (unlike carriages' wooden ones) with a four-stroke engine of his own design between the rear wheels, with a very advanced coil ignition and evaporative cooling rather than a radiator. Power was transmitted by a belt to a counter-shaft with a differential, from each side of which a roller chain transmitted power to that side's rear wheel, which ran loose on the rear axle. The 1885 version was difficult to control, leading to a collision with a wall during a public demonstration.

Benz continued to work on his Motorwagen and on 29 January 1886 he submitted the patent application for an "automobile fueled by gas". He first tested it on public roads in the early summer of 1886 and drove it publicly on the Ringstrasse in Mannheim on 3 July 1886. He received patent number 37345 in November 1886 (the date given for a patent is the application date) and the vehicle henceforth became known as "Benz Patent-Motorwagen".

The next year Benz created the Motorwagen Model 2, which had several modifications, and in 1889, the definitive Model 3 with wooden wheels was introduced, showing at the Paris Expo the same year.

Benz began to sell the vehicle (advertising it as "Benz Patent-Motorwagen") in the late summer of 1888, making it the first commercially available automobile in history. The second customer of the Motorwagen was a Parisian bicycle manufacturer Emile Roger, who had already been building Benz engines under license from Benz for several years. Roger added the Benz automobiles (many built in France) to the line he carried in Paris and initially most were sold there.

The early 1888 version of the Motorwagen had only two gears and could not climb hills unaided. This limitation was rectified after Bertha Benz drove one of the vehicles a great distance and suggested to her husband the addition of a third gear for climbing hills. In the course of this trip she also invented brake pads.

== Bertha Benz's long-distance drive ==
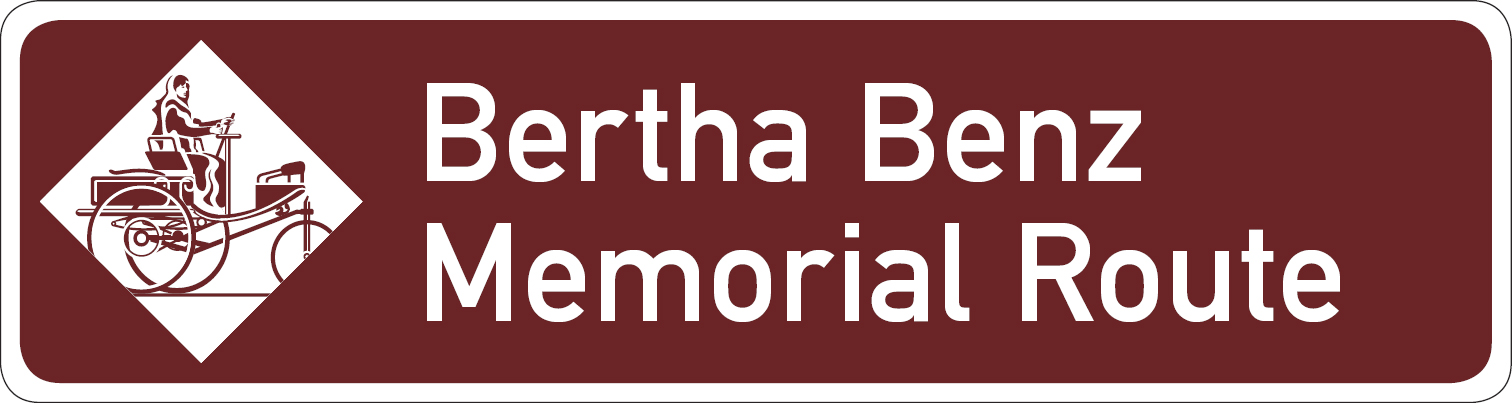
Official signpost of Bertha Benz Memorial Route, commemorating the world's first long-distance journey with a Benz Patent-Motorwagen Number 3 in 1888

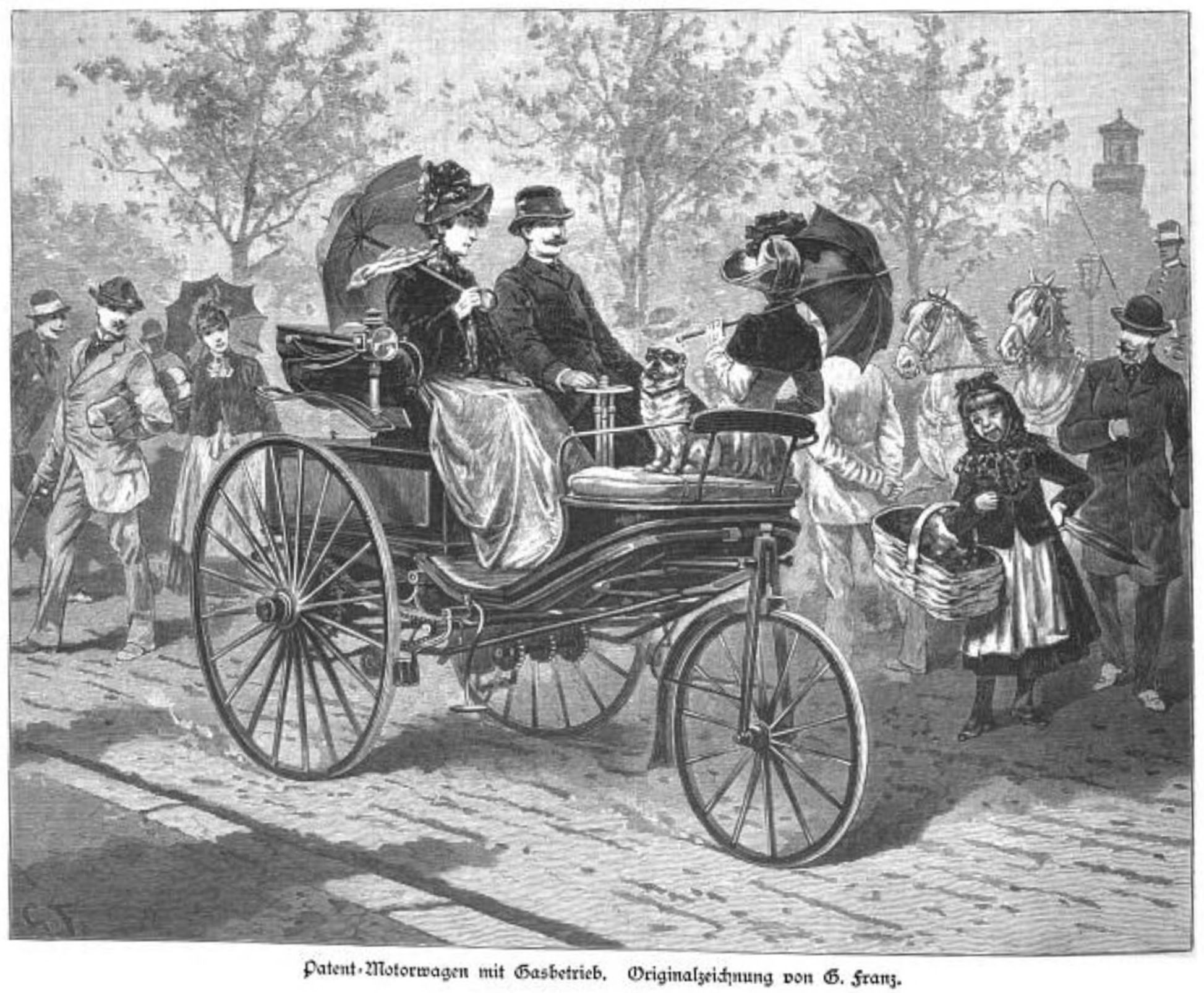
Carl and Bertha Benz driving around Munich in their Model 2 Benz Patent-Motorwagen, September 1888

The world's first long-distance internal combustion automobile trip was undertaken by Bertha Benz and their sons Eugen and Richard (with Eugen driving) using a production version of the Model 2. On the morning of 5 August 1888 Bertha – supposedly without the knowledge of her husband – took the vehicle on a 104 km (65 mi) trip from Mannheim to Pforzheim to visit her mother, taking her sons Eugen and Richard with her. In addition to having to locate pharmacies along the way to refuel, she repaired various technical and mechanical problems. One of these included the invention of brake lining; after some longer downhill slopes she ordered a shoemaker to nail leather onto the brake blocks. Bertha Benz and sons finally arrived at nightfall, announcing the achievement to Karl by telegram. It had been her intention to demonstrate the feasibility of using the Benz Motorwagen for travel and to generate publicity in the manner now referred to as live marketing. Today, the event is celebrated every two years in Germany with an antique automobile rally.

In 2008, the Bertha Benz Memorial Route was officially approved as a route of the industrial heritage of mankind, because it follows Bertha Benz's tracks of the world's first long-distance journey by automobile in 1888. The public can now follow the 194 km (121 mi) of signposted route from Mannheim via Heidelberg to Pforzheim (Black Forest) and back. The return trip – which didn't go through Heidelberg – was along a different, slightly shorter route, as shown on the maps of the Bertha Benz Memorial Route.

Benz's Model 3 made its wide-scale debut to the world in the 1889 World's Fair in Paris; about twenty-five Motorwagens were built between 1886 and 1893.

== Benz and Cie. expansion ==
Early logo used on automobiles by Benz

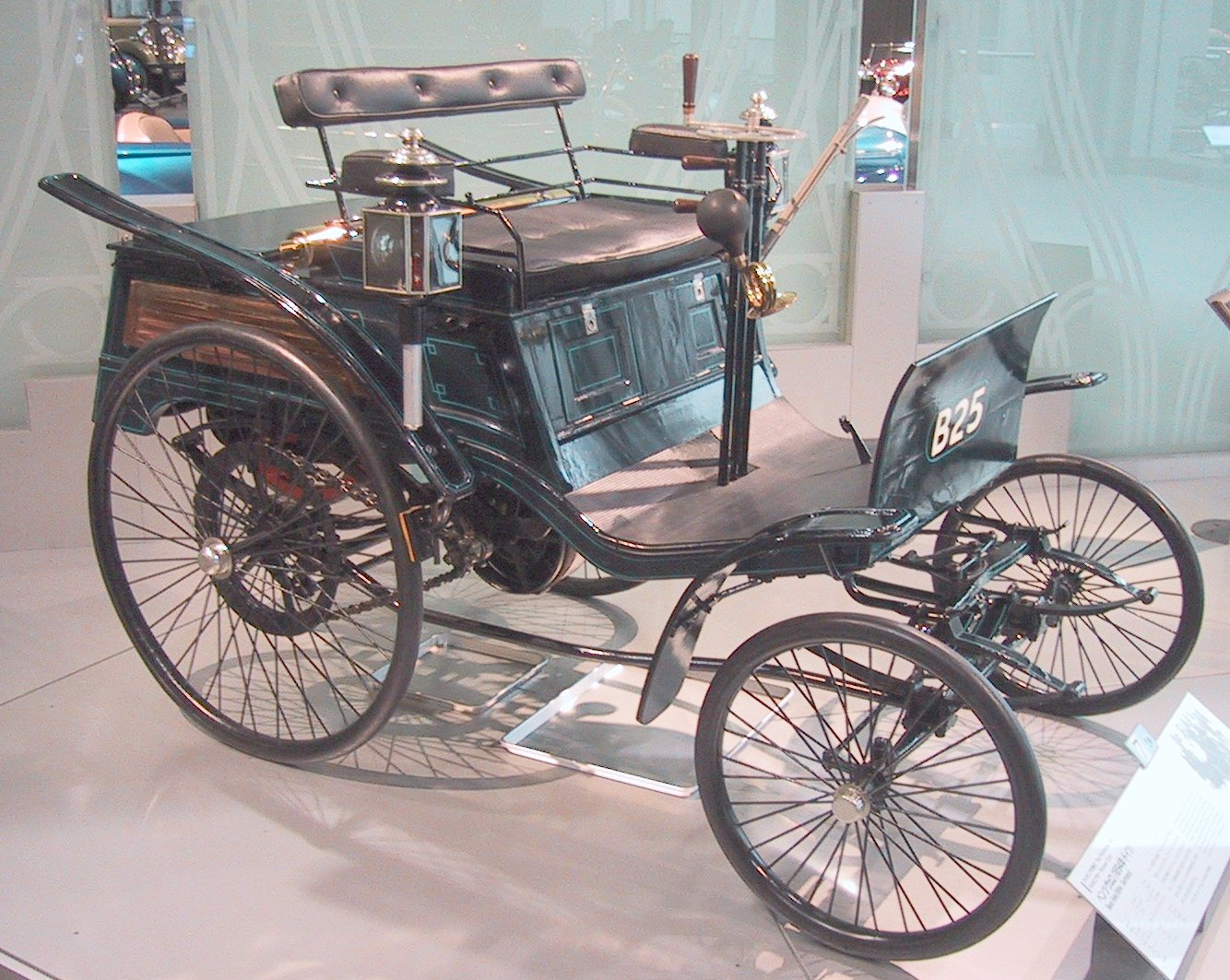
Benz introduced the Velo in 1894, becoming the first large scale production automobile

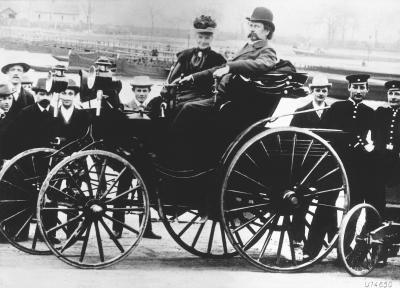
Bertha Benz with her husband in a Benz Victoria, model 1894

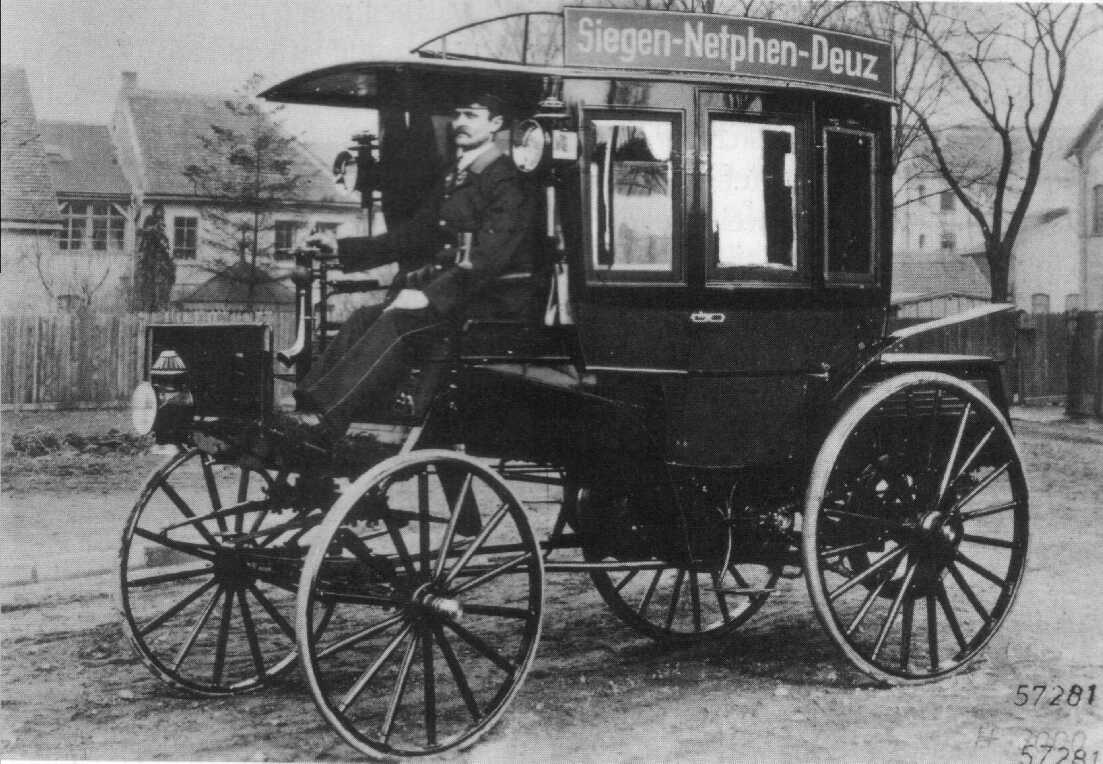
First internal combustion-engined bus in history: the Benz Omnibus, built in 1895 for the Netphener bus company

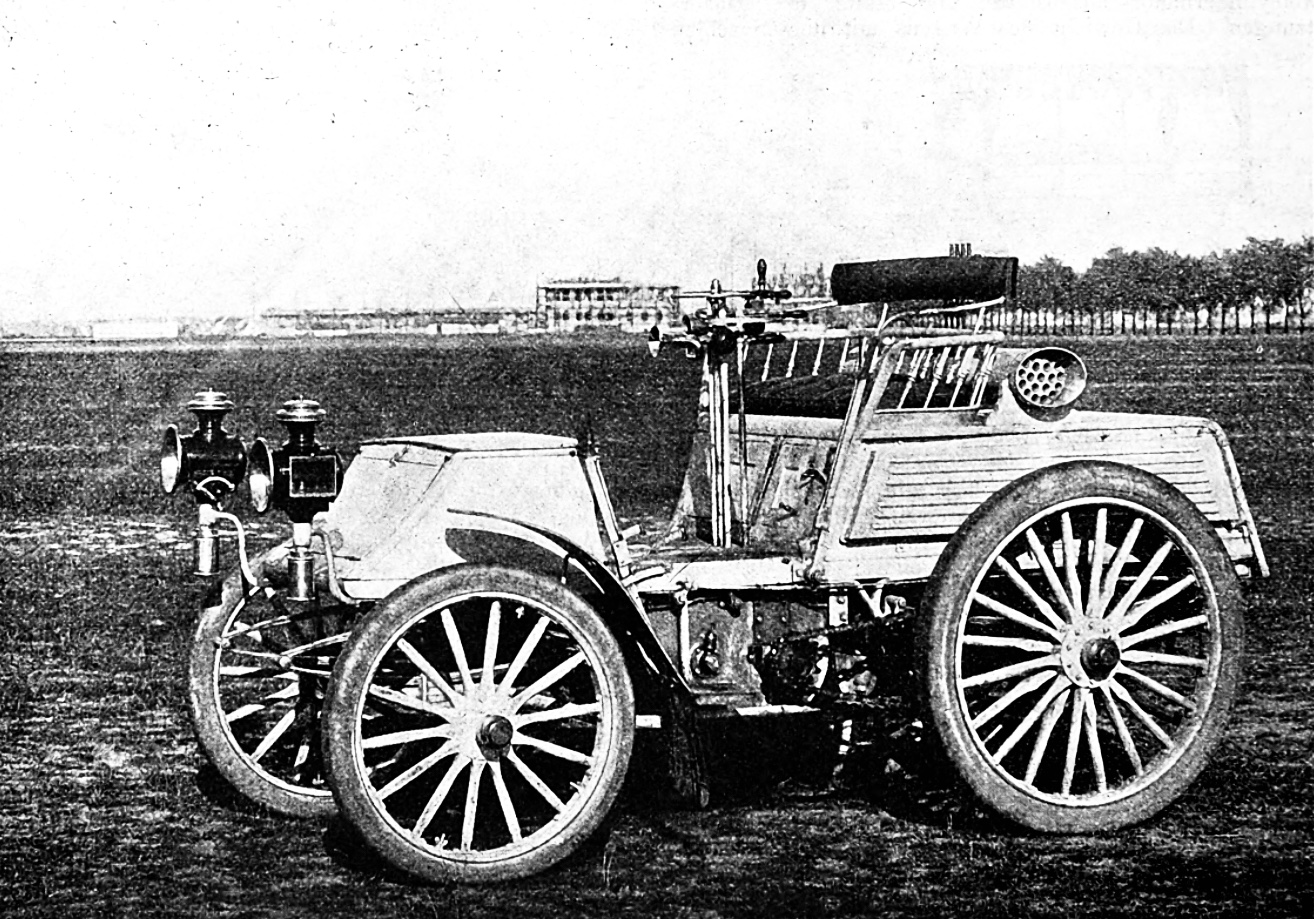
Benz racing car two-cylinder 14 hp (1899)

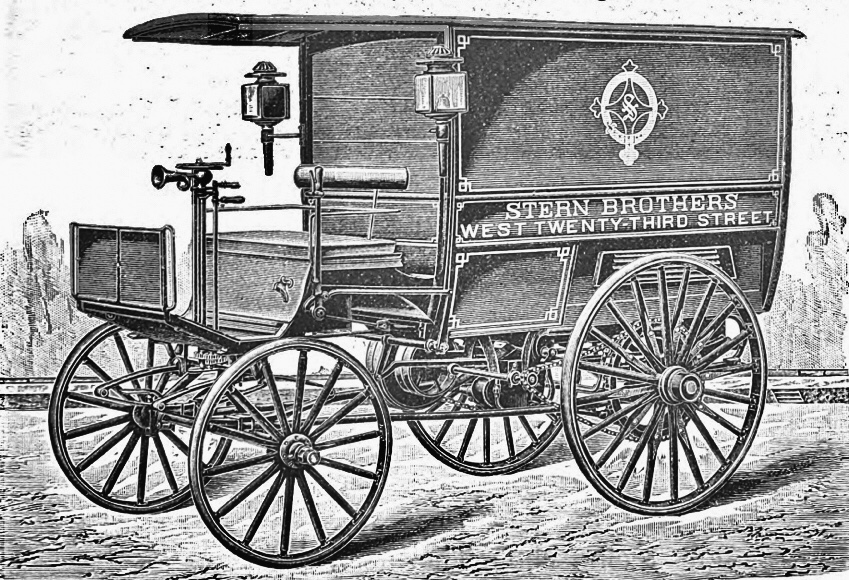
Benz delivery wagon 0.4 t (1898-1900) 6 hp

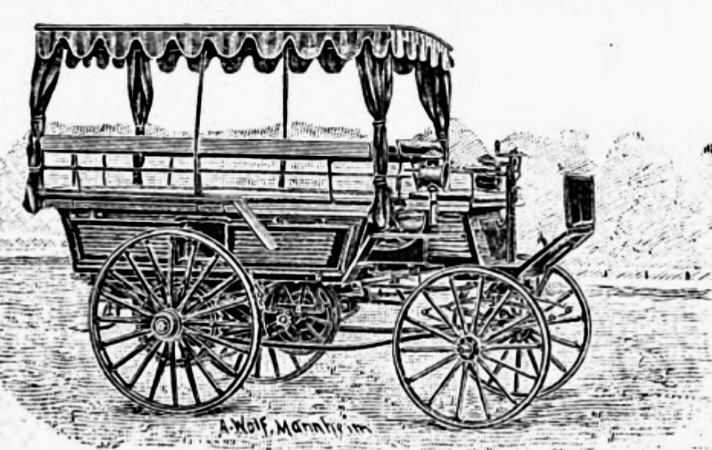
Omnibus „Break“ 12 seater 13-15 hp (1898-1900)

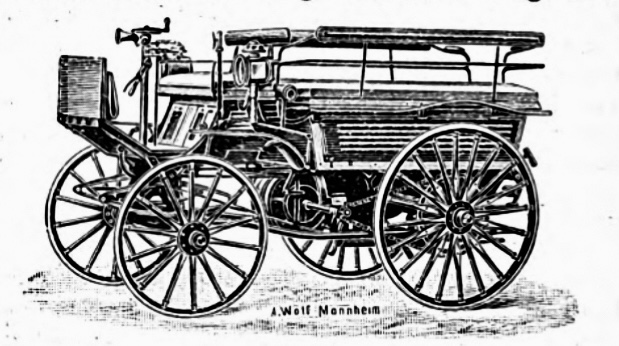
Omnibus „Break“ 8 seater 8-10 hp (1899-1901)

The great demand for static internal combustion engines forced Benz to enlarge the factory in Mannheim, and in 1886 a new building located on Waldhofstrasse (operating until 1908) was added. Benz & Cie. had grown in the interim from 50 employees in 1889 to 430 in 1899.

During the last years of the nineteenth century, Benz was the largest automobile company in the world with 572 units produced in 1899.

Because of its size, in 1899, Benz & Cie. became a joint-stock company with the arrival of Friedrich von Fischer and Julius Ganß, who came aboard as members of the Board of Management. Ganß worked in the commercialization department, which is somewhat similar to marketing in contemporary corporations.

The new directors recommended that Benz should create a less expensive automobile suitable for mass production. From 1893 to 1900 Benz sold the four wheel, two seat Victoria, a two-passenger automobile with a 2.2 kW (3.0 hp) engine, which could reach the top speed of 18 km/h (11 mph) and had a pivotal front axle operated by a roller-chained tiller for steering. The model was successful with 85 units sold in 1893, and was produced in a four-seated version with face-to-face seat benches called the "Vis-à-Vis".

From 1894 to 1902, Benz produced over 1,200 of what some consider the first mass-produced car, the Velocipede, later known as the Benz Velo. The early Velo had a 1L 1.5-metric-horsepower (1.5 hp; 1.1 kW) engine, and later a 3-metric-horsepower (3 hp; 2 kW) engine. giving a top speed of 19 km/h (12 mph).

The Velo participated in the world's first automobile race, the 1894 Paris to Rouen, where Émile Roger finished 14th, after covering the 126 km (78 mi) in 10 hours 01-minute at an average speed of 12.7 km/h (7.9 mph).

In 1895, Benz designed the first truck with an internal combustion engine in history. Benz also built the first motor buses in history in 1895, for the Netphener Omnibusgesellschaft (lit. Netphener bus company).

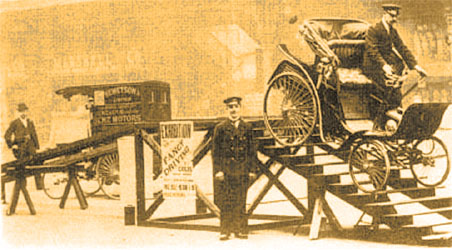
Benz "Velo" model presentation in London 1898

In 1896, Benz was granted a patent for his design of the first flat engine. It had horizontally opposed pistons, a design in which the corresponding pistons reach top dead centre simultaneously, thus balancing each other with respect to momentum. Many flat engines, particularly those with four or fewer cylinders, are arranged as "boxer engines", boxermotor in German, and also are known as "horizontally opposed engines". This design was used in the Volkswagen Beetle and is still used by Porsche, Subaru, and some high performance engines used in racing cars. In motorcycles, the most famous boxer engine is found in BMW Motorrad, though the boxer engine design was used in many other models, including Victoria, Harley-Davidson XA, Zündapp, Wooler, Douglas Dragonfly, Ratier, Universal, IMZ-Ural, Dnepr, Gnome et Rhône, Chang Jiang, Marusho, and the Honda Gold Wing.

Although Gottlieb Daimler died in March 1900—and there is no evidence that Benz and Daimler knew each other nor that they knew about each other's early achievements—eventually, competition with Daimler Motoren Gesellschaft (DMG) in Stuttgart began to challenge the leadership of Benz & Cie. In October 1900, the main designer of DMG, Wilhelm Maybach, built the engine that would later be used in the Mercedes-35hp of 1902. The engine was built to the specifications of Emil Jellinek under a contract for him to purchase thirty-six vehicles with the engine, and for him to become a dealer of the special series. Jellinek stipulated the new engine be named Daimler-Mercedes (for his daughter). Maybach would quit DMG in 1907, but he designed the model and all of the important changes. After testing, the first was delivered to Jellinek on 22 December 1900. Jellinek continued to make suggestions for changes to the model and obtained good results racing the automobile in the next few years, encouraging DMG to engage in commercial production of automobiles, which they did in 1902.

Benz countered with Parsifal, introduced in 1903 with a vertical twin engine that achieved a top speed of 60 km/h (37 mph). Then, without consulting Benz, the other directors hired some French designers.

France was a country with an extensive automobile industry based on Maybach's creations. Because of this action, after difficult discussions, Benz announced his retirement from design management on 24 January 1903, although he remained as director on the Board of Management through its merger with DMG in 1926 and, remained on the board of the new Daimler-Benz corporation until his death in 1929.

Benz's sons Eugen and Richard left Benz & Cie. in 1903, but Richard returned to the company in 1904 as the designer of passenger vehicles.

That year, sales of Benz & Cie. reached 3,480 automobiles, and the company remained the leading manufacturer of automobiles.

Along with continuing as a director of Benz & Cie., Benz founded another company, C. Benz Söhne, (with his son Eugen and closely held within the family), a privately held company for manufacturing automobiles. The brand name used the first initial of Benz's first name, "Carl".

Year	Production figures trucks & buses	model
1895	4	Omnibus Typ Hotel „Siegen-Netphen-Deuz“ 8 Seats 5 hp
1896	> 3	0.3 t Combinations-Lieferungswagen 2.75 hp; 0.3 t Lieferungswagen 5 hp (plus two persons); Omnibus Typ Hotel „Siegen-Netphen-Deuz“ 8 Seats 5 hp
1897	> 3	0.3 t Combinations-Lieferungswagen 2.75 hp; 0.3 t Lieferungswagen 5 hp (plus two persons); Omnibus Typ Hotel „Siegen-Netphen-Deuz“ 8 Seats 5 hp
1898	> 4	0.3 t Combinations-Lieferungswagen 2.75 hp; 0.4 t Lieferungswagen 6 hp (plus two persons); Omnibus Typ Hotel „Siegen-Netphen-Deuz“ 8 Seats 5 hp; Omnibus „Break“ 12 seater 13-15 hp
1899	> 4	0.3 t Combinations-Lieferungswagen 2.75 hp; 0.4 t Lieferungswagen 6 hp (plus two persons); Omnibus „Break“ 8 seater 8-10 hp; Omnibus „Break“ 12 seater 13-15 hp
1900	> 7	0.3 t Combinations-Lieferungswagen 2.75 hp; 0.3 t Combinations-Lieferungswagen 3.5 hp; 0.4 t Lieferungswagen 6 hp (plus two persons); 1.25 t 5-7 hp; 2.5 t 10 hp; Omnibus „Break“ 8 seater 8-10 hp; Omnibus „Break“ 12 seater 13-15 hp
1901	> 6	0.3 t Combinations-Lieferungswagen 3.5 hp; 0.3 t Combinations-Lieferungswagen 4.5 hp; 1.25 t 5-7 hp; 2.5 t 10 hp; 5 t 14 hp; Omnibus „Break“ 8 seater 8-10 hp
1902	> 4	0.3 t Combinations-Lieferungswagen 4.5 hp; 1.25 t 5-7 hp; 2.5 t 10 hp; 5 t 14 hp
1903		
1904		
1905		
1906		
1907		1.5 t; 2 t; 3 t; 5 t; 6 t; Omnibus „Reichspost“; Omnibus „Wien“; Omnibus „München“; Omnibus „Schwarzwald“; Omnibus „Norddeutschland“; Omnibus“Berlin“
1908	298	0.5t D/8; 0.75 t D/12; 0.75 t D/18; 1.5 t C/12; 1.5 t C/18; 1.5 t C/28; 2 t C/28; 2t C/36; 3t C/28; 3 t C/36; 4-5 t C/28; 4-5 t C/36; 5-6 t C/28; 5-6 t C/36; Omnibus „Reichspost“; Omnibus „Baden-Baden“; Omnibus „Schwarzwald“; Aussichtswagen; Omnibus „Wien“; Omnibus „Köln“; Omnibus „Norddeutschland“; Omnibus „Berlin“
1909	428	
1910	381	0.3 t 14 hp; 0.75 t 14 hp; 0.75 t 18 hp; 1 t 18 hp; 1.5 t 18 hp; 3 t 30 hp; 3t 40 hp; 3.5 t 30 hp; 3.5 t 40 hp; 4-5 t 30 hp; 4-5 t 40 hp; 4-5 t Subventions LKW 40 hp; 4-5 t Subventions LKW 44 hp; 5-6 t C/28; 5-6 t C/36; Omnibus Hotel; Omnibus „Reichspost“; Omnibus „Baden-Baden“; Omnibus „Würtemberg“; Omnibus „Schwarzwald“; Omnibus Ausichtswagen; Omnibus „Wien“; Omnibus „München“; Omnibus „St. Petersburg“
1911	441	0.5-0.75 t Typ D11; 0.75-1.5 t Typ KL 11; 1.5-2 t Typ BL 10; 3 t Typ SL 10; 4 t Typ SL 12; 5 t Typ GL 12; Omnibus „Reichspost“; Omnibus Typ B.O. 10; Omnibus Typ S.O. 10; Omnibus Typ S.O. 10 „Imperial“
1912	571	0.5-0.75 t Typ D11; 0.75-1.5 t Typ KL 11; 1.5-2 t Typ BL 10; 3 t Typ SL 10; 4 t Typ SL 12; 5 t Typ GL 12; Omnibus „Reichspost“; Omnibus Typ B.O. 10; Omnibus Typ S.O. 10; Omnibus Typ S.O. 10 „Imperial“
1913	654	0.5-0.75 t Typ D11; 0.75-1.5 t Typ KL 11; 1.5-2 t Typ BL 10; 3 t Typ SL 10; 4 t Typ SL 12; 5 t Typ GL 12; 0.5 t 20 hp; 0.75 t 20-28 hp; 1 t 20-25 hp; 3-4 t Typ BK 13; 4-5 t Typ ML 13; Omnibus Typ S.O. 10 „Imperial“; Omnibus Typ KL; Omnibus Typ KO; Omnibus Typ BL; Omnibus Typ BO; Omnibus Typ SL; Omnibus Typ SO
1914	1217	0.5 t 20 hp; 0.75 t 20-28 hp; 1 t 20-25 hp; 1.5 t 22-35 hp; 2-3 t Typ KL 14; 3-4 t Typ BK 13; 4-5 t Typ ML 13; Omnibus Typ S.O. 10 „Imperial“; Omnibus Typ KL; Omnibus Typ KO; Omnibus Typ BL; Omnibus Typ BO; Omnibus Typ SL; Omnibus Typ SO; Omnibus Typ EK 1; Omnibus Typ KL 14; Omnibus Typ BL 10; Omnibus Typ BO 14; Omnibus Typ SO 14
1915	1132	0.75 t 20-28 hp; 1.5 t 22-35 hp; 2-3 t Typ KL 14; 3-4 t Typ BK 13; 4-5 t Typ ML 13; Omnibus Typ EK 1; Omnibus Typ KL 14; Omnibus Typ BL 10; Omnibus Typ BO 14; Omnibus Typ SO 14
1916	1162	0.75 t 20-28 hp; 1.5 t 22-35 hp; 2-3 t Typ KL 14; 3 t Typ 3 K2; 3-4 t Typ BK 13; 4-5 t Typ 5 K; 4-5 t Typ 5 K2; 4-5 t Typ ML 13; Omnibus Typ EK 1; Omnibus Typ KL 14; Omnibus Typ BL 10; Omnibus Typ BO 14; Omnibus Typ SO 14
1917	1354	2-3 t Typ KL 14; 3 t Typ 3 K2; 4-5 t Typ 5 K; 4-5 t Typ 5 K2; Omnibus Typ EK 1; Omnibus Typ KL 14; Omnibus Typ BL 10; Omnibus Typ BO 14; Omnibus Typ SO 14
1918	1285	2-3 t Typ KL 14; 3 t Typ 3 K2; 3 t Typ ET 3; 4-5 t Typ 5 K; 4-5 t Typ 5 K2; Omnibus Typ EK 1; Omnibus Typ KL 14; Omnibus Typ BL 10; Omnibus Typ BO 14; Omnibus Typ SO 14
1919	797	3 t Typ 3 K2; 1-1.5 t Typ 1 C; 3 t Typ ET 3; 4-5 t Typ 5 K; 4-5 t Typ 5 K2; Omnibus Typ EK 1; Omnibus Typ KL 14; Omnibus Typ BL 10; Omnibus Typ BO 14; Omnibus Typ SO 14
1920	901	3 t Typ 3 K2; 3 t Typ ET 3; 4-5 t Typ 5 K; 4-5 t Typ 5 K2; 4-5 t Typ 5 K3; 1-1.5 t Typ 1 C; 2-2.5 t Typ 2C; 3-3.5 t Typ 3C; Typ VP 25; Omnibus Typ 1 C; Omnibus Typ 2 C; Omnibus Typ 3 C
1921	1106	4-5 t Typ 5 K3; 1-1.5 t Typ 1 C; 1-1.5 t Typ 1 CN; 2-2.5 t Typ 2C; 2-2.5 t Typ 2CN; 3-3.5 t Typ 3C; 3-3.5 t Typ 3CN; 3-3.5 t Typ 3CN long; Omnibus Typ 1 C; Omnibus Typ 2 C; Omnibus Typ 3 C
1922	885	4-5 t Typ 5 K3; 1-1.5 t Typ 1 CN; 2-2.5 t Typ 2CN; 3-3.5 t Typ 3CN; 3-3.5 t Typ 3CN long; Omnibus Typ 1 C; Omnibus Typ 2 C; Omnibus Typ 3 C
1923	983	4-5 t Typ 5 K3; 1-1.5 t Typ 1 CN; 2-2.5 t Typ 2CN; 3-3.5 t Typ 3CN; 3-3.5 t Typ 3CN long; 3 t Typ MS; 5 t Typ 5 CN; Omnibus Typ 1 C; Omnibus Typ 2 C; Omnibus Typ 3 C; Omnibus Typ 1 CN; Omnibus Typ 2 CN; Omnibus Typ 3 CN
1924	909	4-5 t Typ 5 K3; 1-1.5 t Typ 1 CN; 2-2.5 t Typ 2CN; 3-3.5 t Typ 3CN; 3-3.5 t Typ 3CN long; Typ VP 25; Omnibus Typ 1 CN; Omnibus Typ 2 CN; Omnibus Typ 3 CN
1925	1364	4-5 t Typ 5 K3; 1-1.5 t Typ 1 CN; 2-2.5 t Typ 2CN; 3-3.5 t Typ 3CN; 3-3.5 t Typ 3CN long; 5 t Typ 5 CN; Omnibus Typ 1 CN; Omnibus Typ 2 CN; Omnibus Typ 3 CN; Omnibus Typ 2 CNa; Omnibus Typ 2 CNb
1926	929	1-1.5 t Typ 1 CN; 2-2.5 t Typ 2CN; 3-3.5 t Typ 3CN; 3-3.5 t Typ 3CN long—; Omnibus Typ 1 CN; Omnibus Typ 2 CN; Omnibus Typ 3 CN
(1926)	merger with DMG	
Sum		

=== Blitzen Benz ===
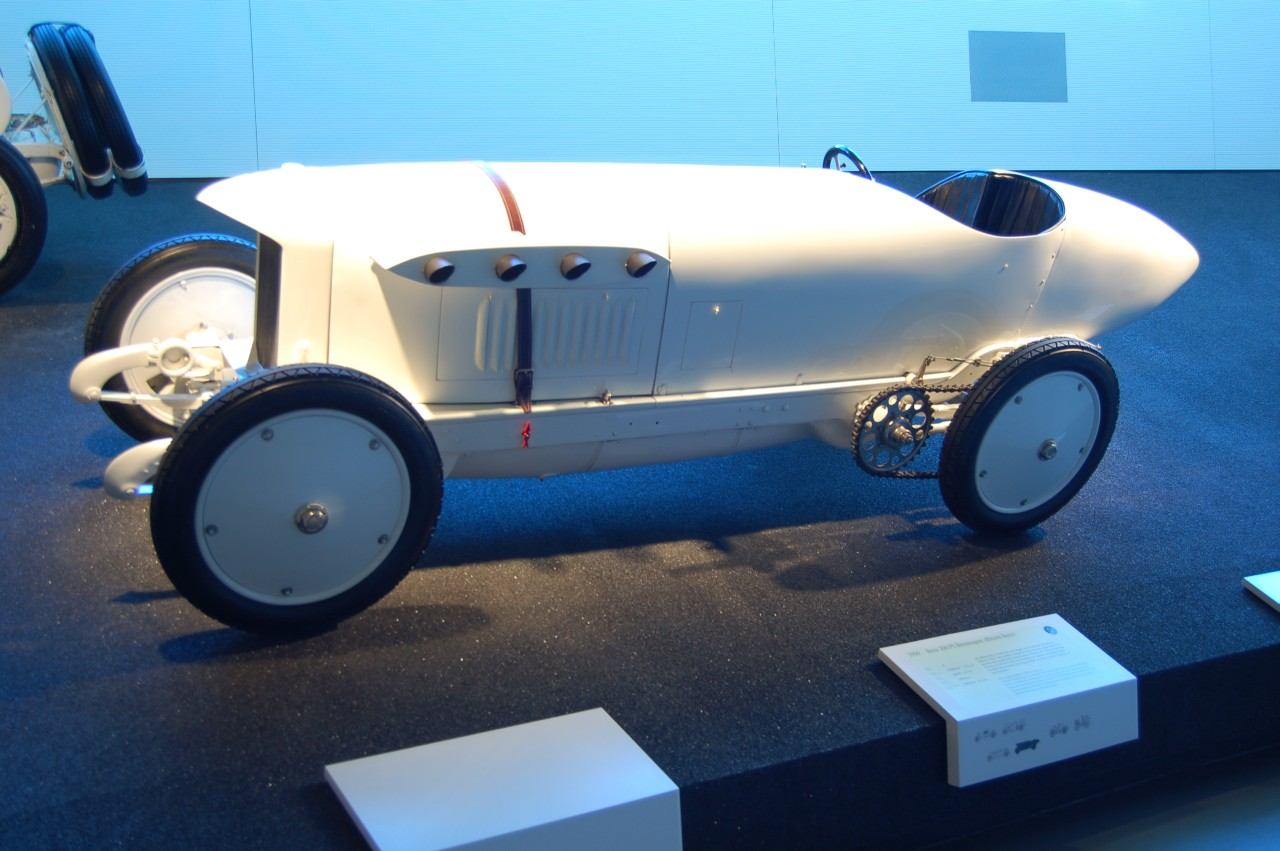
1909 Blitzen Benz – built by Benz & Cie., which held the land speed record

In 1909, the Blitzen Benz was built in Mannheim by Benz & Cie. The bird-beaked vehicle had a 21.5-liter (1312ci), 150 kW (200 hp) engine, and on 9 November 1909 in the hands of Victor Hémery of France, the land speed racer at Brooklands, set a record of 226.91 km/h (141.00 mph), said to be "faster than any plane, train, or automobile" at the time, a record that was not exceeded for ten years by any other vehicle. It was transported to several countries, including the United States, to establish multiple records of this achievement.

== Benz Söhne, 1906–1923 ==
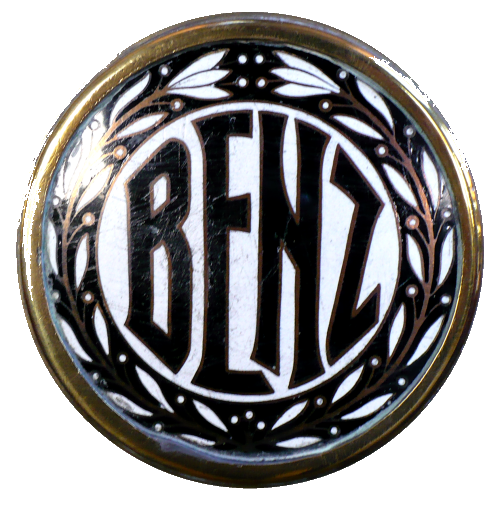
Logo with laurels used on Benz & Cie. automobiles after 1909

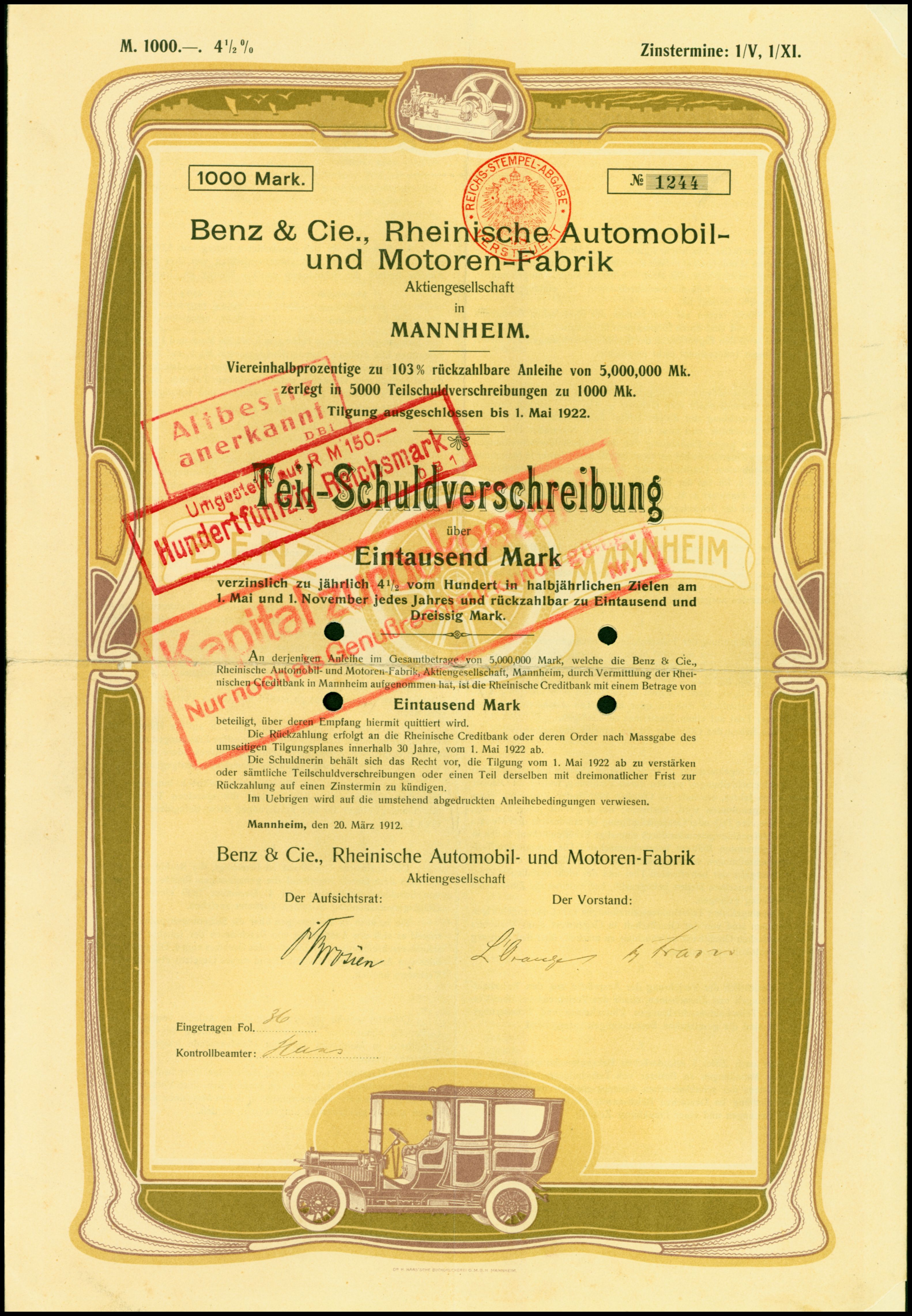
Bond of the Benz & Cie., issued 1912

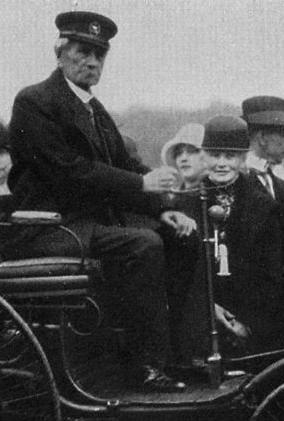
Carl and Bertha Benz in c. 1926

Carl Benz, Bertha Benz, and their son, Eugen, moved 10 kilometres (6.2 mi) east of Mannheim to live in nearby Ladenburg, and solely with their own capital, founded the private company, C. Benz Sons (German: Benz Söhne) in 1906, producing automobiles and gas engines. The latter type was replaced by petrol engines because of lack of demand.

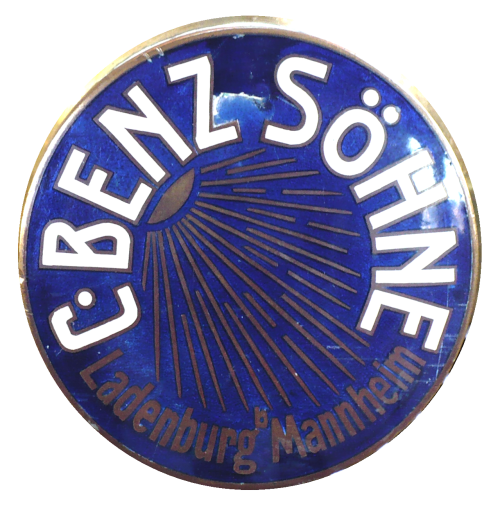
Logo on family held business production vehicles

This company never issued stocks publicly, building its own line of automobiles independently from Benz & Cie., which was located in Mannheim. The Benz Sons automobiles were of good quality and became popular in London as taxis.

In 1912, Benz liquidated all of his shares in Benz Sons and left the family-held company in Ladenburg to Eugen and Richard, but he remained as a director of Benz & Cie.

During a birthday celebration for him in his home town of Karlsruhe on 25 November 1914, the seventy-year-old Benz was awarded an honorary doctorate by his alma mater, the Karlsruhe University, thereby becoming—Dr. Ing. h. c. Benz.

Almost from the very beginning of the production of automobiles, participation in sports car racing became a major method to gain publicity for manufacturers. At first, the production models were raced and the Benz Velo participated in the first automobile race: Paris to Rouen 1894. Later, investment in developing racecars for motorsports produced returns through sales generated by the association of the name of the automobile with the winners. Unique race vehicles were built at the time such as the first mid-engine and aerodynamically designed, Tropfenwagen, a "teardrop" body introduced at the 1923 European Grand Prix at Monza.

In the last production year of the Benz Sons company, 1923, three hundred and fifty units were built. During the following year, 1924, Benz built two additional 8/25 hp units of the automobile manufactured by this company, tailored for his personal use, which he never sold; they are still preserved.

=== Benz's Lebensfahrt ===
In November 1923 the Leipzig publishing house Koehler & Amelang asked him to write his memoirs. With the help of his sons-in-law, Professor Volk of Überlingen and his sons Eugen and Richard, the book Lebensfahrt eines deutschen Erfinders (1925) was prepared. It is both a technical history of Benz's development of the motor car and a memoir. A second edition was published in 1936 to celebrate the fiftieth anniversary of the 1886 patent for his first Motorwagen; it had extra material to bring it up to date.

== Toward Daimler-Benz and the first Mercedes-Benz in 1926 ==
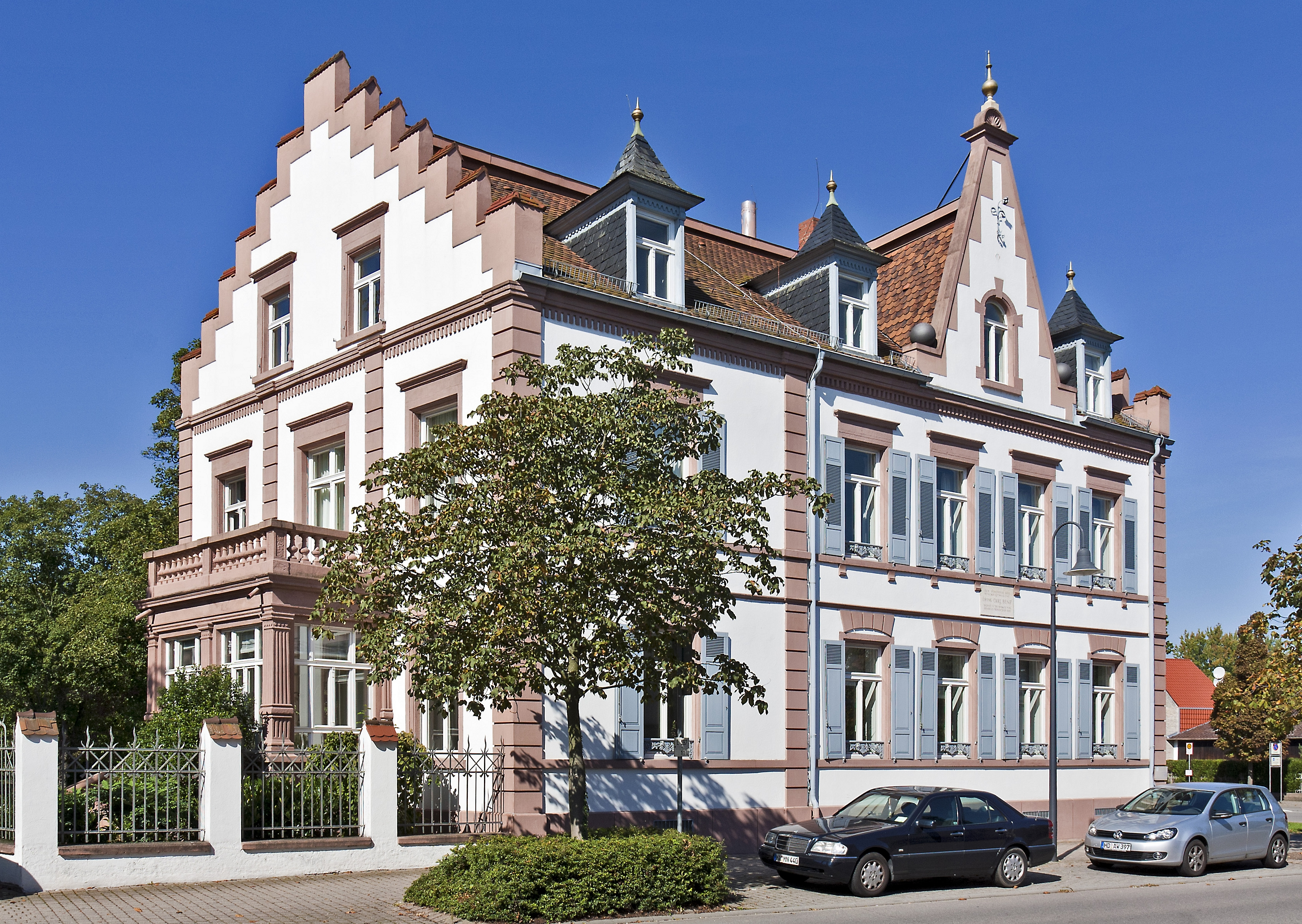
Last home of Carl and Bertha Benz, now the location of the Gottlieb Daimler and Carl Benz Foundation in Ladenburg, in Baden-Württemberg

The German economic crisis worsened. In 1923 Benz & Cie. produced only 1,382 units in Mannheim, and DMG made only 1,020 in Stuttgart. The average cost of an automobile was 25 million marks because of rapid inflation. Negotiations between the two companies resumed and in 1924 they signed an "Agreement of Mutual Interest" valid until the year 2000. Both enterprises standardized design, production, purchasing, sales, and advertising—marketing their automobile models jointly—although keeping their respective brands.

On 28 June 1926, Benz & Cie. and DMG finally merged as the Daimler-Benz company, baptizing all of its automobiles as Mercedes-Benz, honoring the most important model of the DMG automobiles, the 1902 Mercedes 35 hp, along with the Benz name. The name of Mercedes 35 hp had been chosen for ten-year-old Mercédès Jellinek, the daughter of Emil Jellinek who had set the specifications for the new model. Between 1900 and 1909 he was a member of DMG's board of management, however had resigned long before the merger.

Benz was a member of the new Daimler-Benz board of management for the remainder of his life. A new logo was created in 1926, consisting of a three pointed star (representing Daimler's motto: "engines for land, air, and water") surrounded by traditional laurels from the Benz logo, and the brand of all of its automobiles was labeled Mercedes-Benz. Model names would follow the brand name in the same convention as today.

The next year, 1927, the number of units sold tripled to 7,918 and the diesel line was launched for truck production. In 1928, the Mercedes-Benz SSK was presented.

On 4 April 1929, Benz died at his home in Ladenburg at the age of 84 from a bronchial inflammation. Until her death on 5 May 1944, Bertha Benz continued to reside in their last home. Members of the family resided in the home for thirty more years. The Benz home has now been designated as historic and is used as a scientific meeting facility for a nonprofit foundation, the Gottlieb Daimler and Karl Benz Foundation.

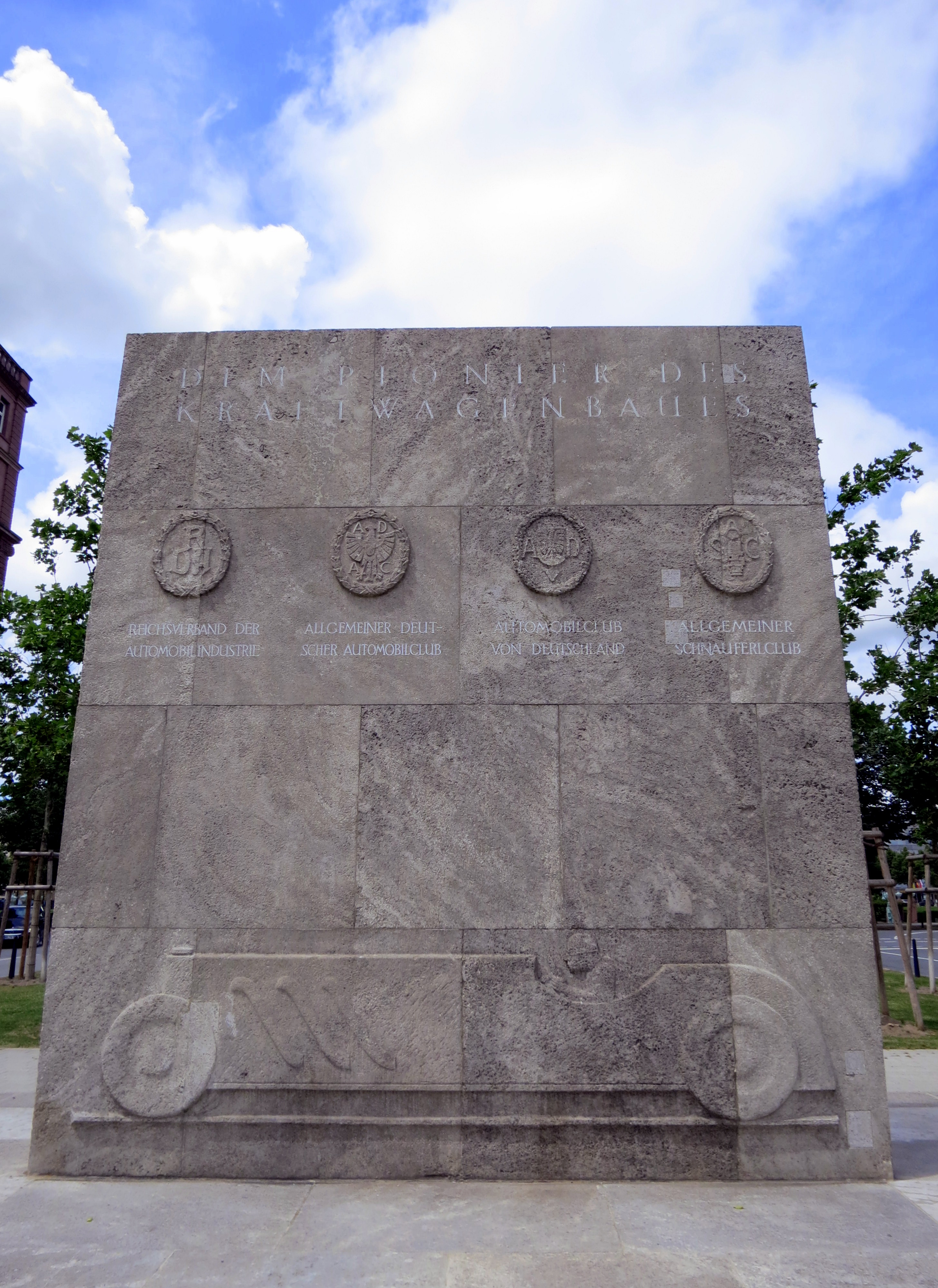
The Carl Benz monument in Mannheim (2015)

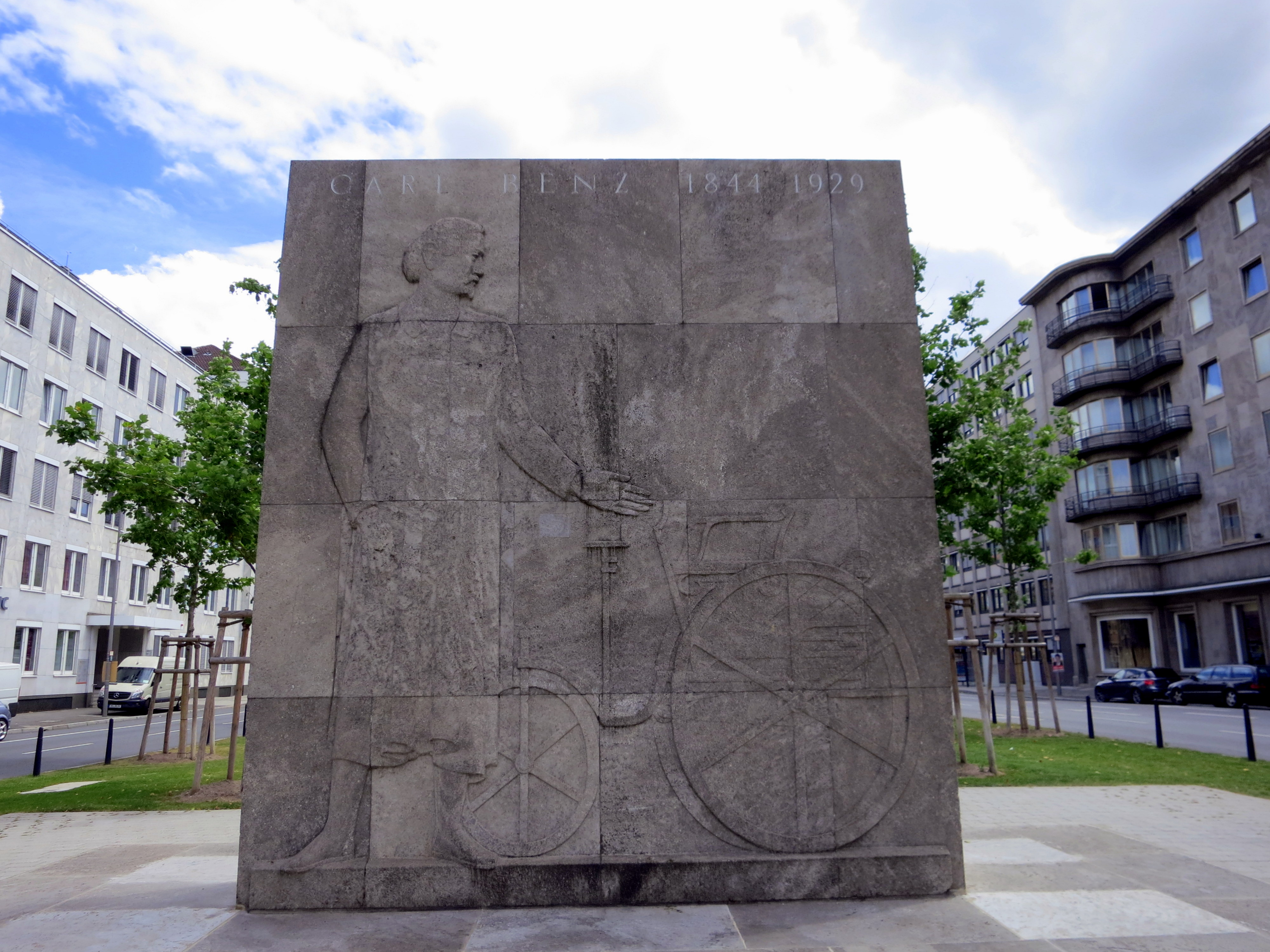
The Carl Benz monument in Mannheim (2015)

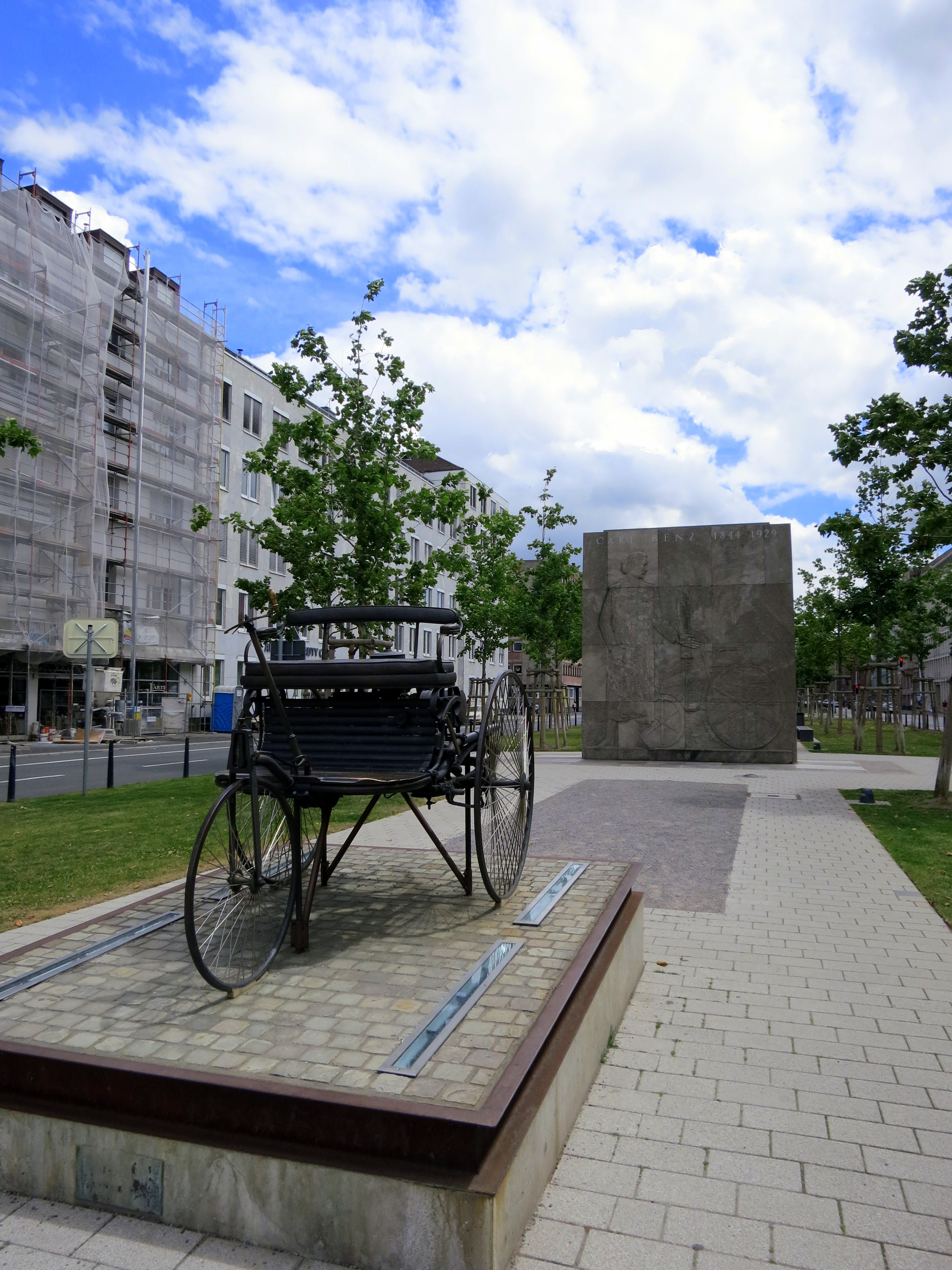
The Carl Benz monument in Mannheim (2015)

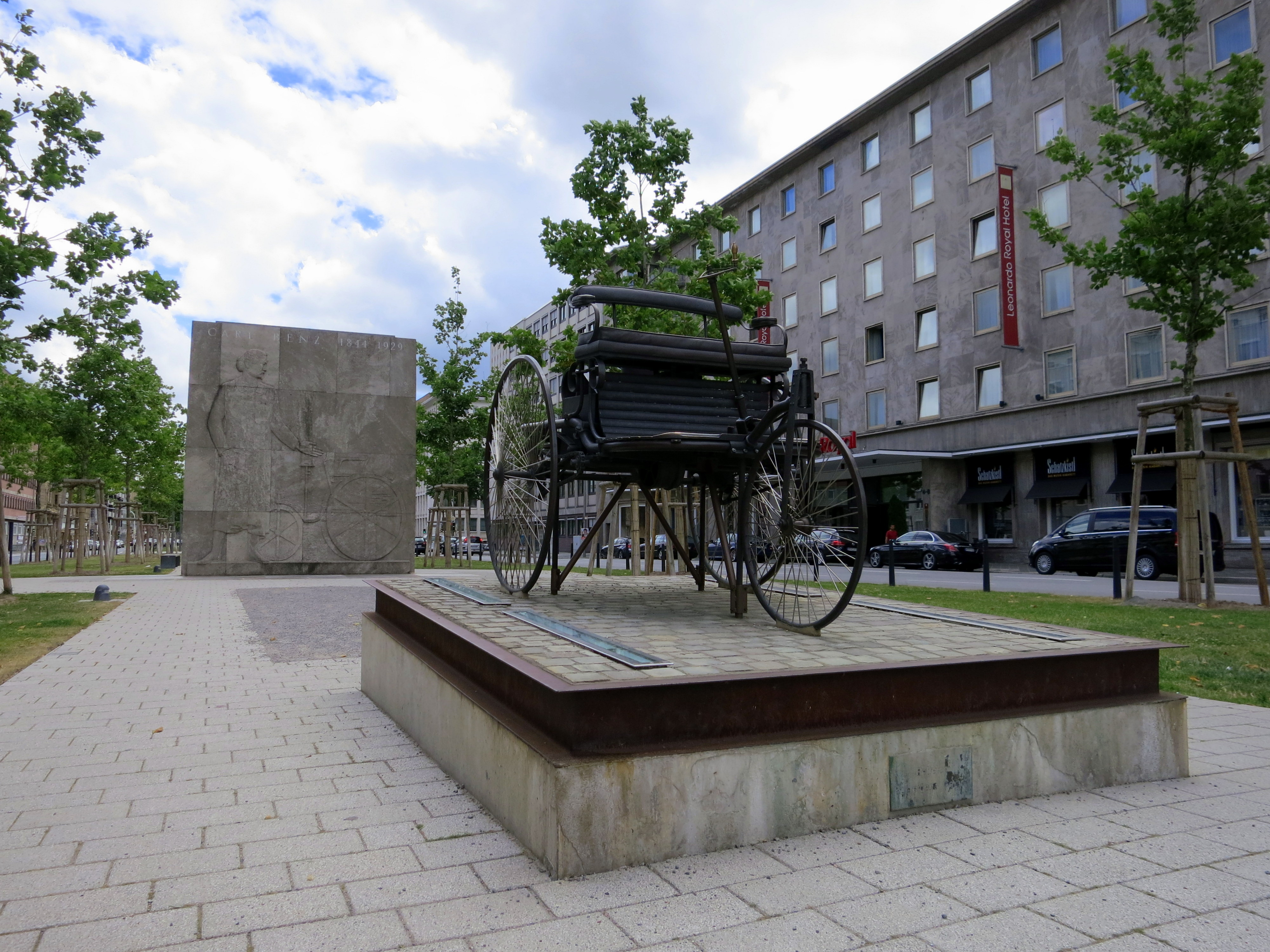
The Carl Benz monument in Mannheim (2015)

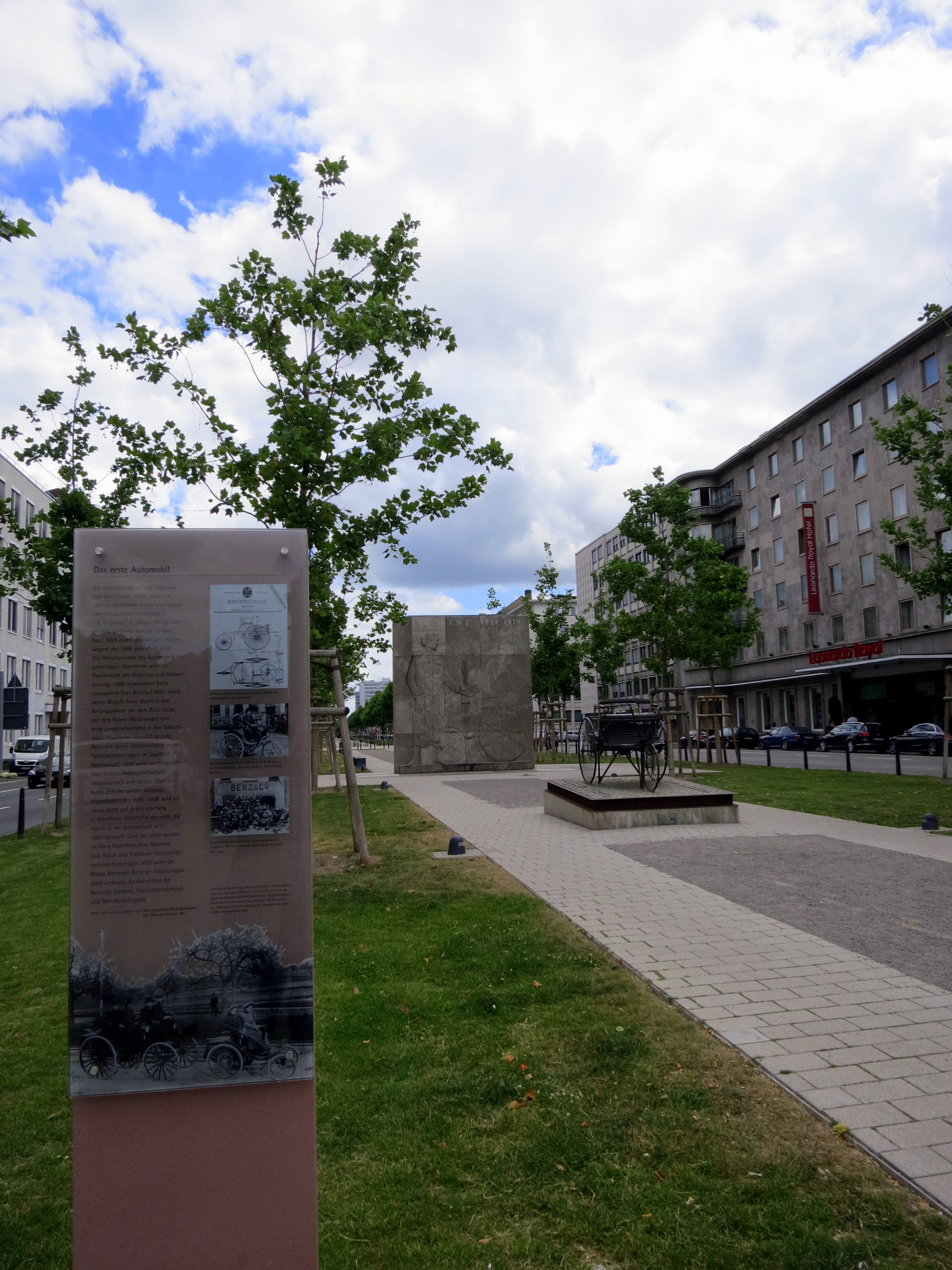
The Carl Benz monument in Mannheim (2015)

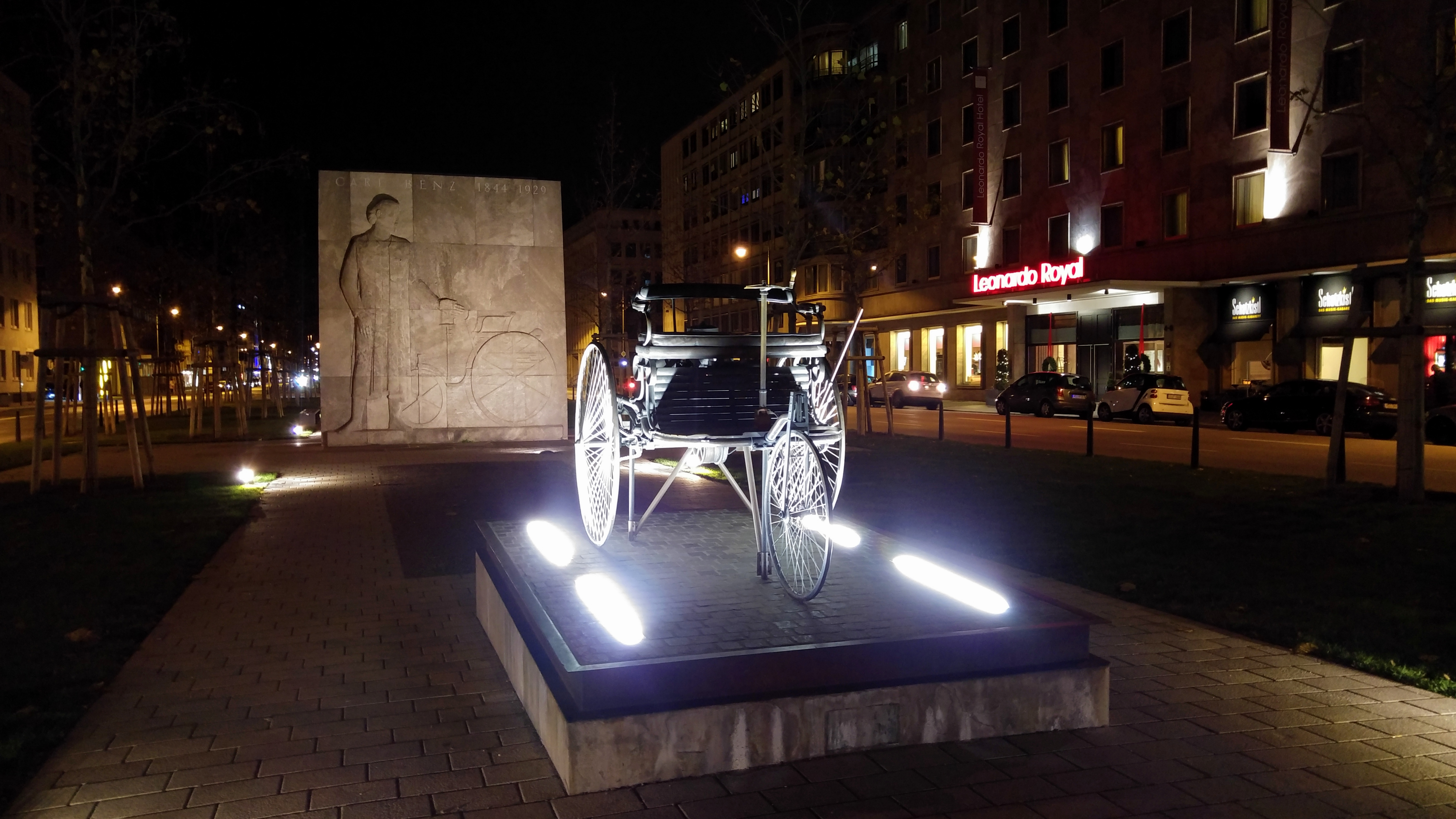
The Carl Benz monument in Mannheim, in the evening (2015)

== Legacy ==
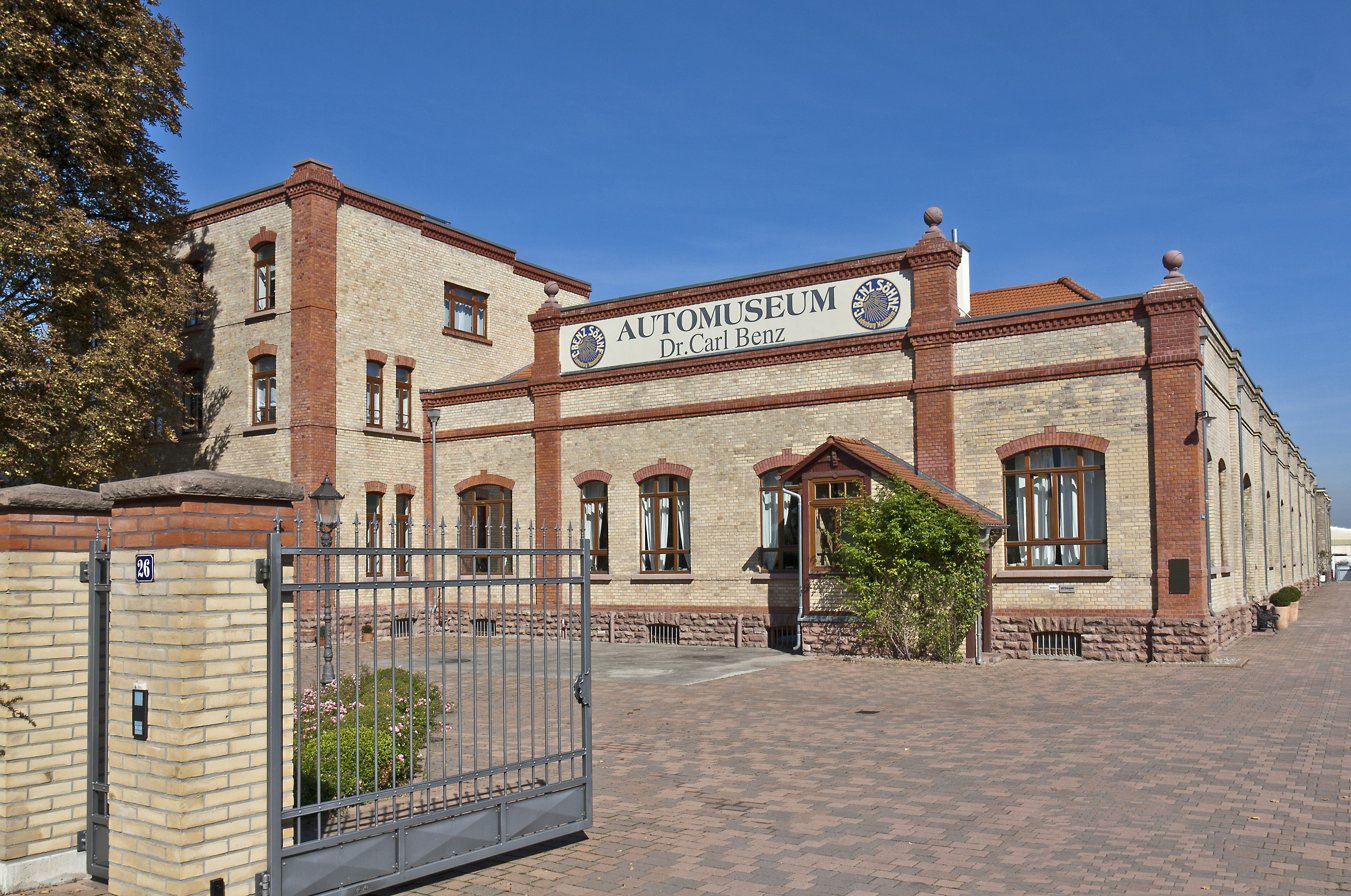
Automuseum Dr. Carl Benz

The Carl-Benz-Gymnasium Ladenburg in Ladenburg, where he lived until his death, is named in his honor, as are the Automuseum Dr. Carl Benz in Ladenburg and the Carl-Benz-Stadion of football club SV Waldhof Mannheim.

In 1984, Benz was inducted into the Automotive Hall of Fame, and into the European Automotive Hall of Fame. In 2022, he was inducted into the National Inventors Hall of Fame.

== In popular culture ==
In 2011, a dramatized television film about the life of Carl and Bertha Benz was made named Carl & Bertha, which premiered on 11 May and was aired by Das Erste on 23 May. A trailer of the film and a "making of" special were released on YouTube.

== See also ==
- Benz (unit)
- List of German inventors and discoverers
- History of the internal combustion engine
