= Mercedes-Benz Museum =

Automobile museum in Stuttgart, Germany

Coordinates: 48°47′19″N 9°14′02″E

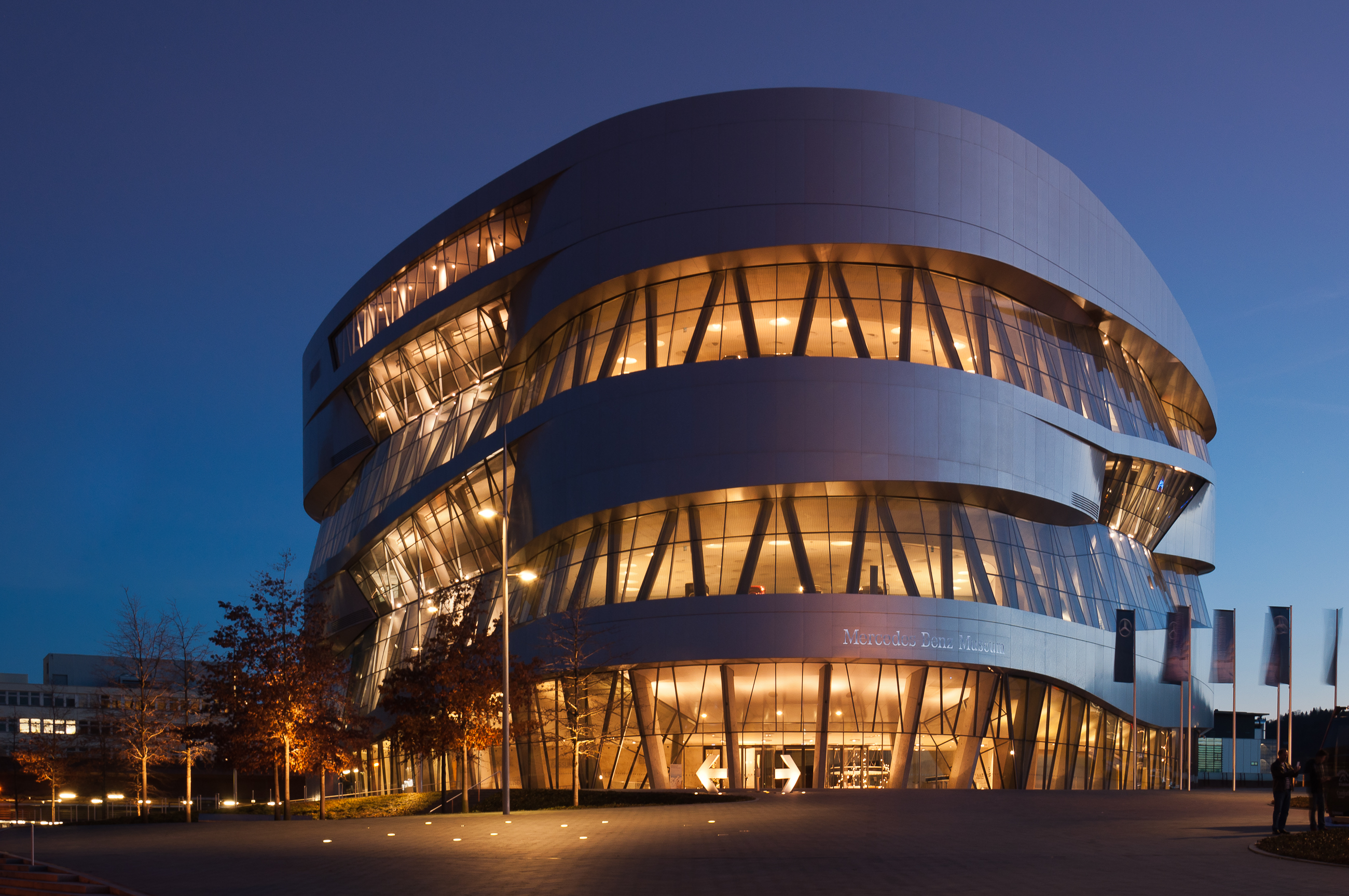
- The museum building
- Established: 19 May 2006; 20 years ago
- Location: Mercedesstr. 100; 70372 Stuttgart; Germany
- Type: Automobile museum
- Visitors: 860,000 (2007)
- Architect: UNStudio
- Website: mercedes-benz.com/museum

The Mercedes-Benz Museum is an automobile museum in Stuttgart, Germany. It covers the history of the Mercedes-Benz brand and the brands associated with it. Stuttgart is home to the Mercedes-Benz brand and the international headquarters of the Mercedes-Benz Group.

== The museum building ==
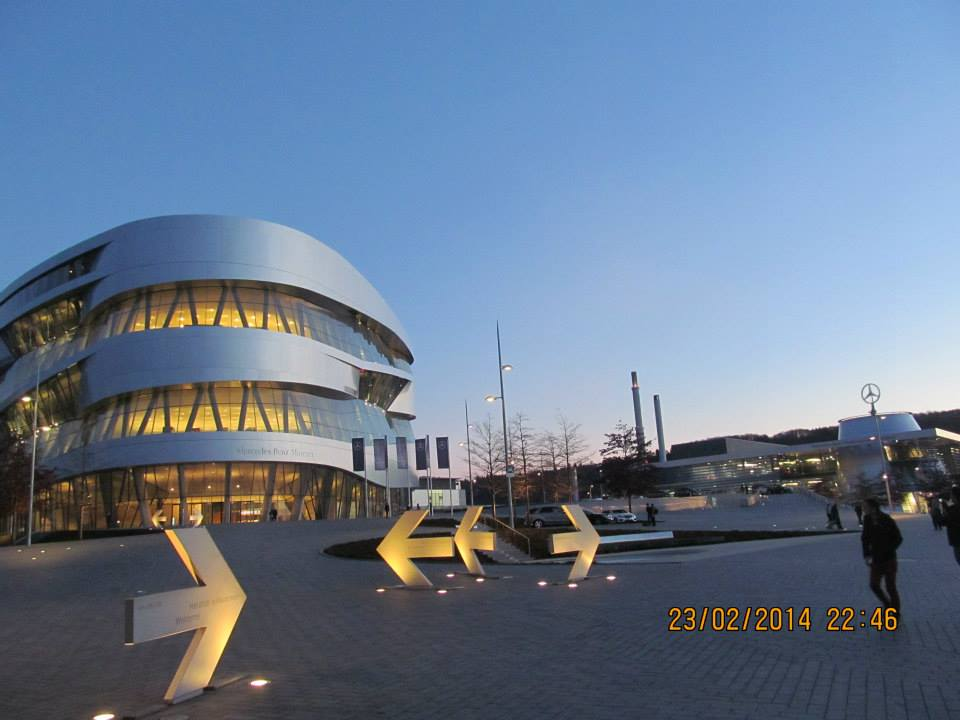
Mercedes Benz Museum Stuttgart

The current building, which stands directly outside the main gate of the Daimler factory in Stuttgart, was designed by UNStudio. It is based on a unique cloverleaf concept using three overlapping circles with the center removed to form a triangular atrium recalling the shape of a Wankel engine. The building was completed and opened on 19 May 2006. Architecture and exhibition concept are closely interwoven, as exhibition designer HG Merz had already been commissioned before the architecture competition in 2001.

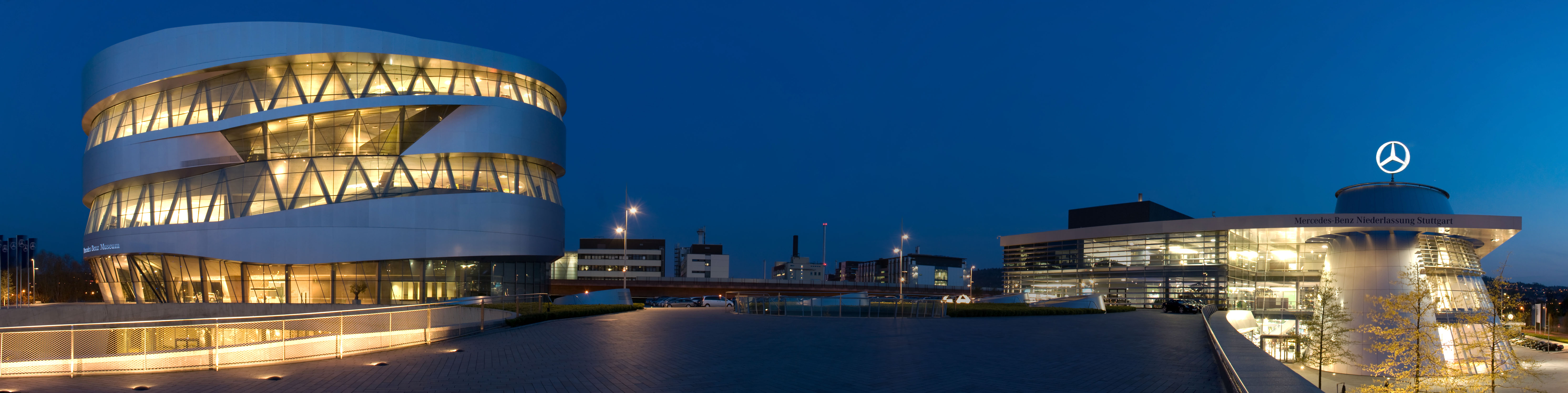
Mercedes-Benz Welt, with the museum (left) and sales center (right)

The building's height and "double helix" interior were designed to maximise space, providing 16,500 square metres (178,000 sq ft) of exhibition space on a footprint of just 4,800 square metres (52,000 sq ft). The double helix also corresponds to the exhibition concept, which divides the museum into the "legend rooms" and the "collections", offering two alternative tours that can be merged at any given point of the museum.

The museum contains more than 160 vehicles, some dating back to the very earliest days of the motorcar engine. The vehicles are maintained by the Mercedes-Benz Classic Center of Fellbach. Previously, the museum was housed in a dedicated building within the factory complex and visitors had in recent decades been transported from the main gate by a secured shuttle.

== Other details ==
The museum provides visitors with free audio tours in a variety of languages. In 2023, the museum was visited by 800,245 people.

Visitors are also offered the opportunity to take a tour of the nearby Untertürkheim engine factory. The factory produces many of the company's diesel engines.

== Gallery ==
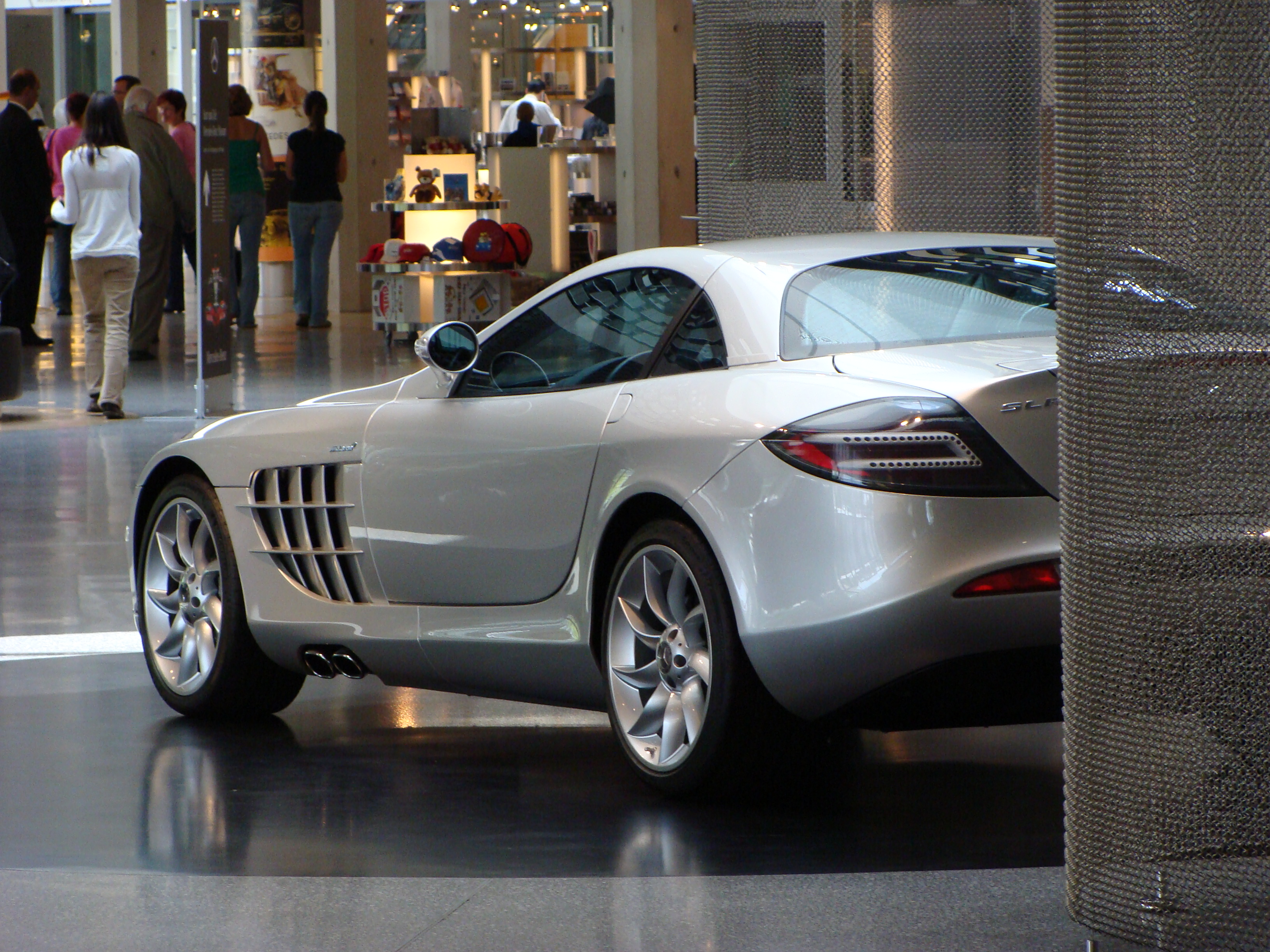
A McLaren SLR near the museum shop, 2008

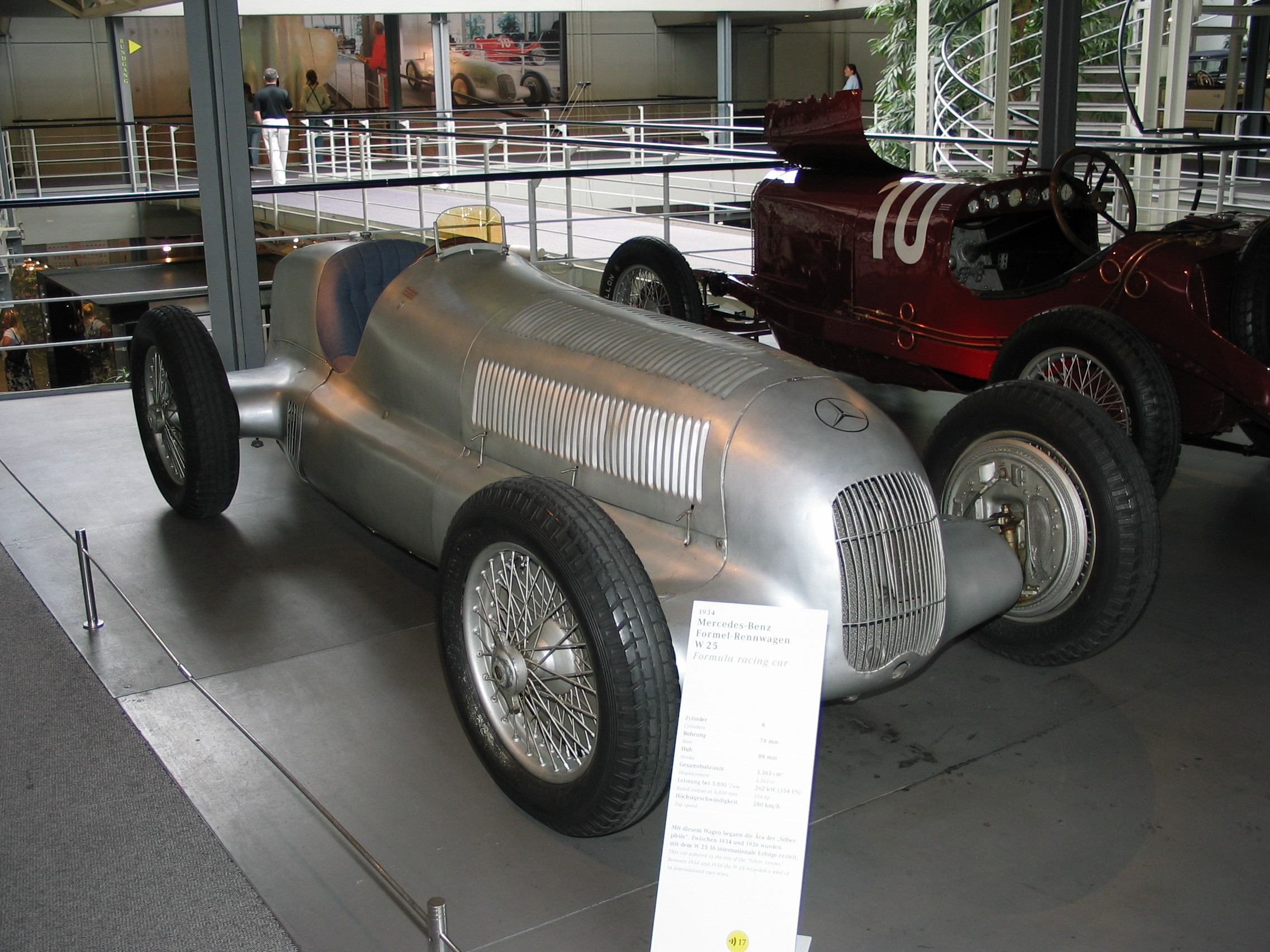
Mercedes-Benz Formel-Rennwagen W25

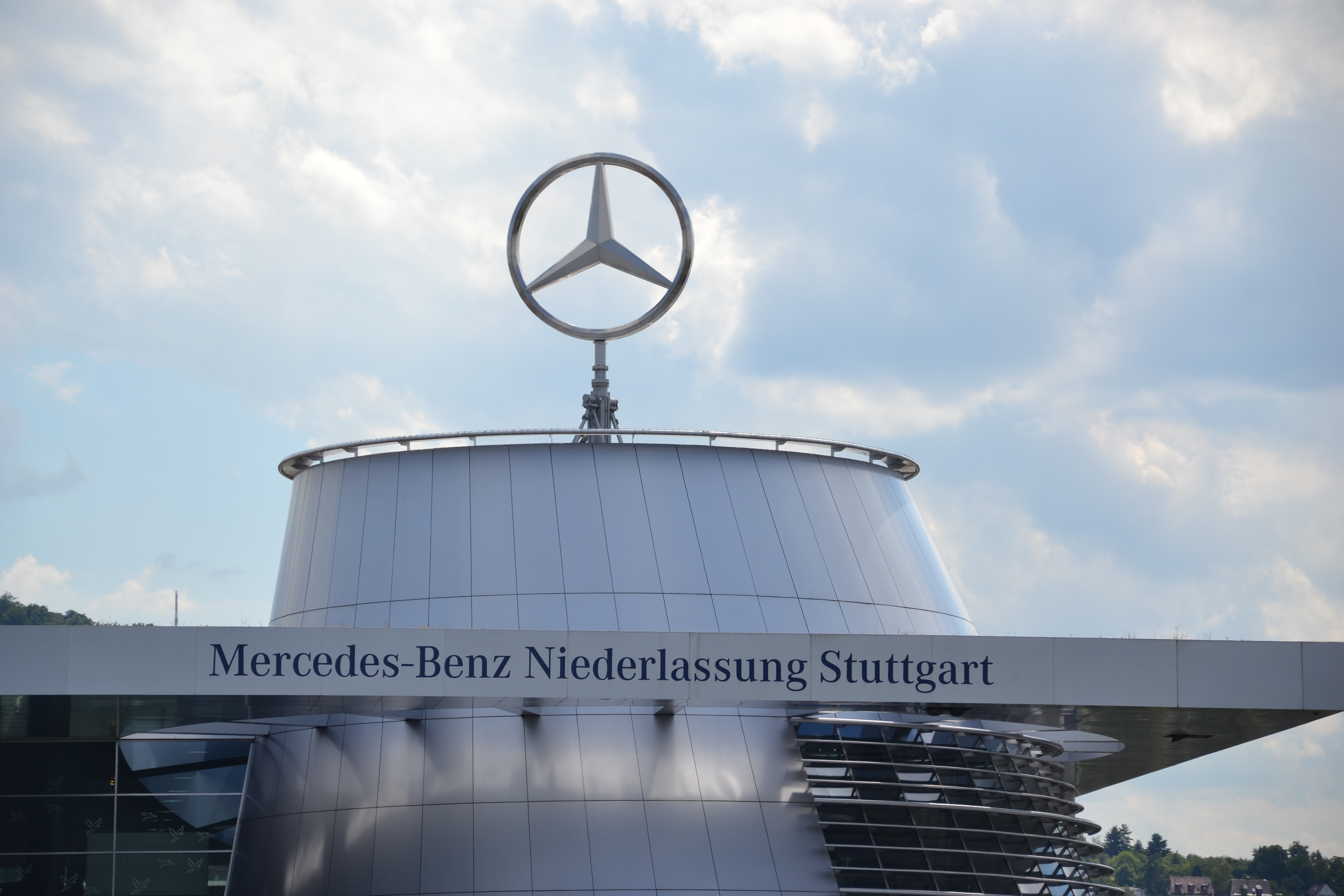
Side view

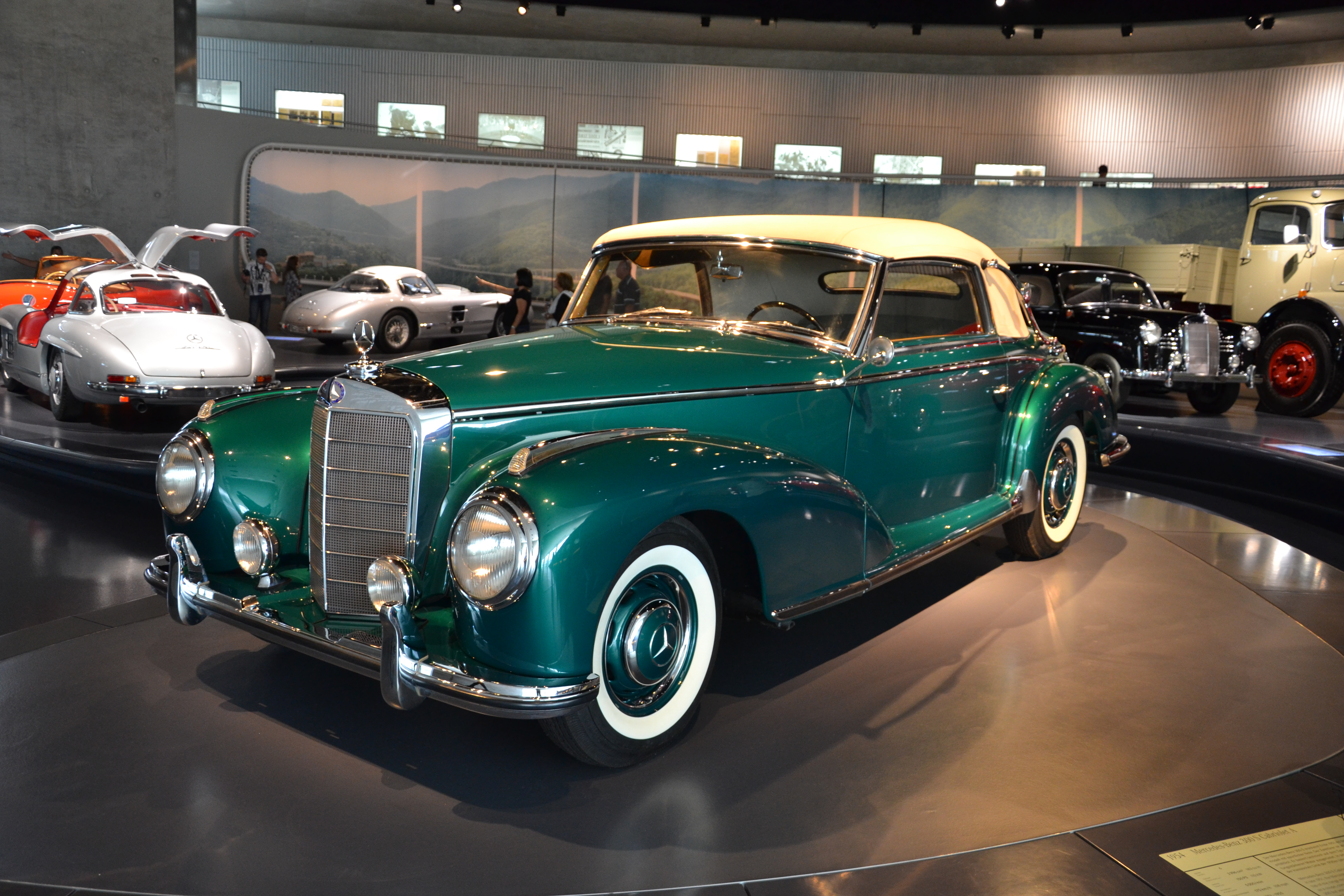

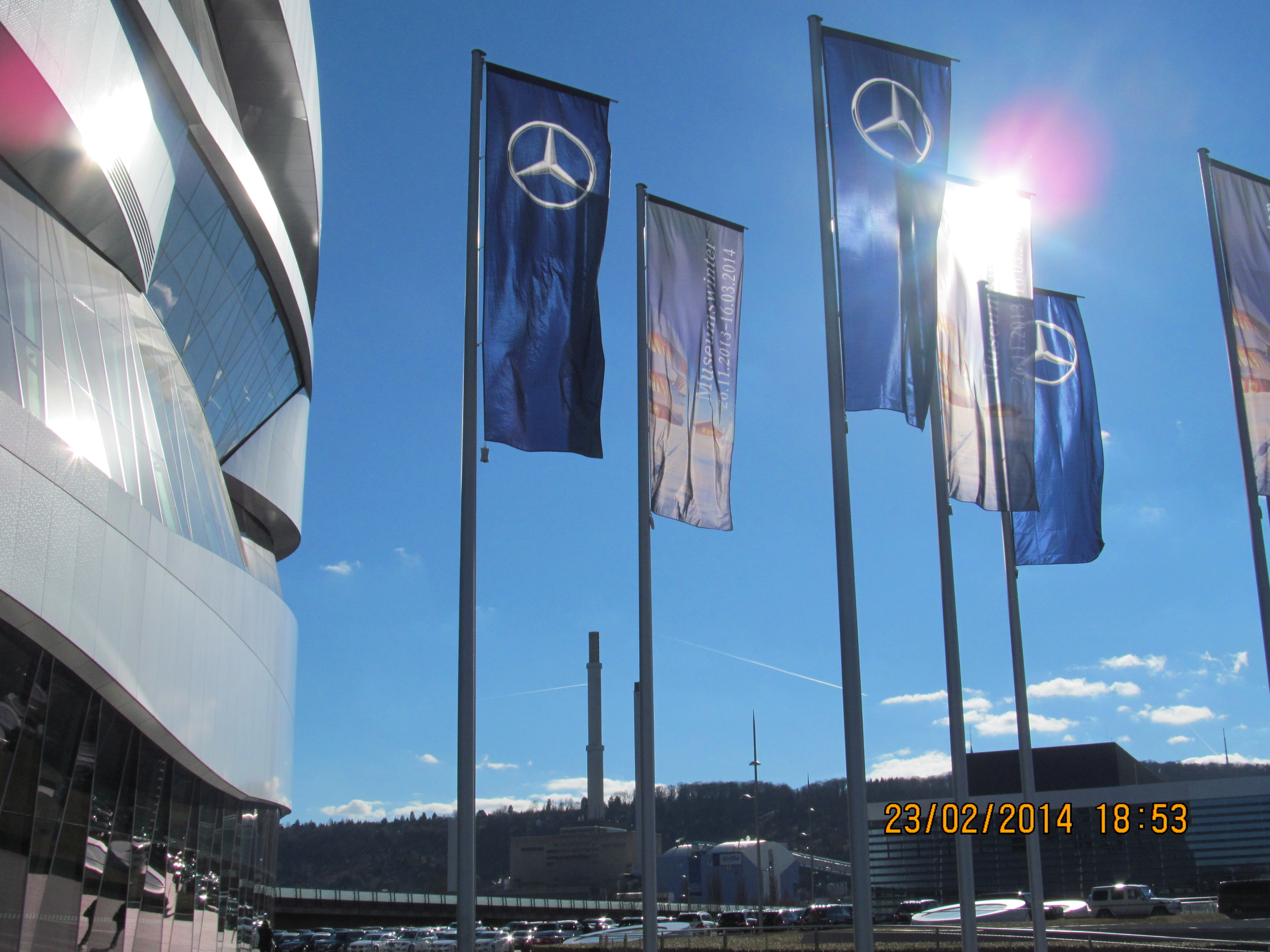
Mercedes Benz Museum, Stuttgart, Germany

== See also ==
- Automuseum Dr. Carl Benz
- List of automobile museums
- Mercedes-Benz World
- Museum for Historical Maybach Vehicles
