= Mercedes-Benz Classic Center =

Vintage Mercedes-Benz vehicle restoration centre

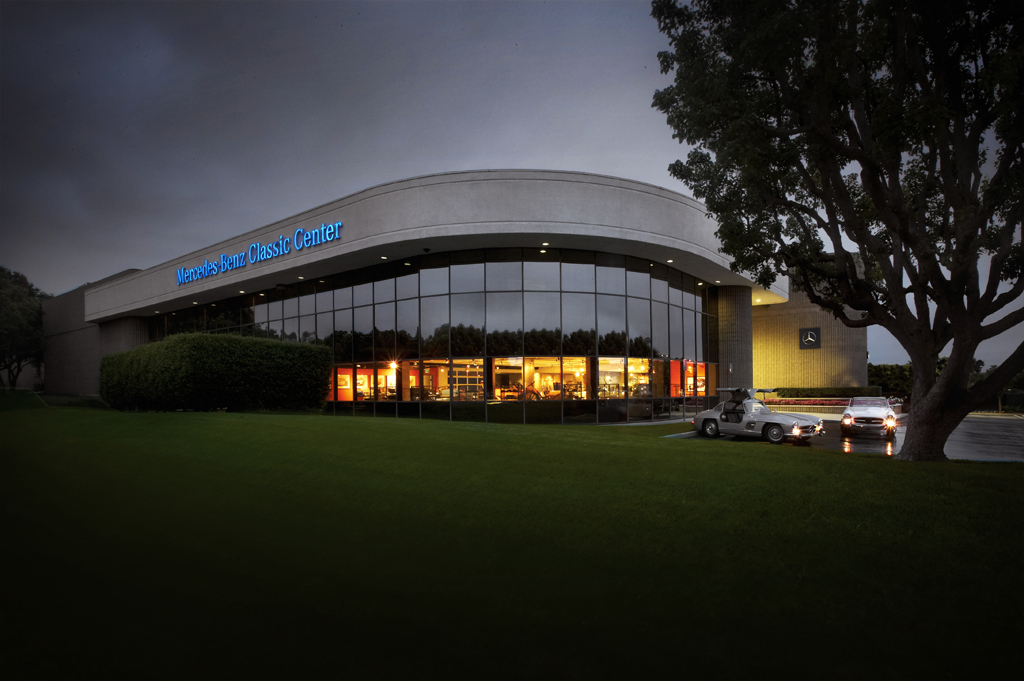
Mercedes-Benz Classic Center in California

The Mercedes-Benz Classic Center is part of Mercedes-Benz for restoring and preserving old Mercedes models. It was first opened on May 18, 1993, in Fellbach, Germany, outside Stuttgart. A second location was opened in June 2006 in Irvine, California.

== Overview ==
The Classic Center provides genuine parts, repairs, restorations, and information for and sales of historic Mercedes-Benz vehicles that are at least 15 years out of production. It helps Classic Mercedes-Benz car owners to obtain information and documentation on their vehicle (upon proof of ownership) and also offers consulting and technical appraisals for their vehicles. The Classic Center in Fellbach also maintains the Mercedes-Benz Museum fleet of historic vehicles.

Both Classic Center locations often display automobiles from their collections at concours, historic racing, and other special events. The Irvine, California, location also supplies classic cars for use in Mercedes-Benz television commercials.
