= Automuseum Dr. Carl Benz =

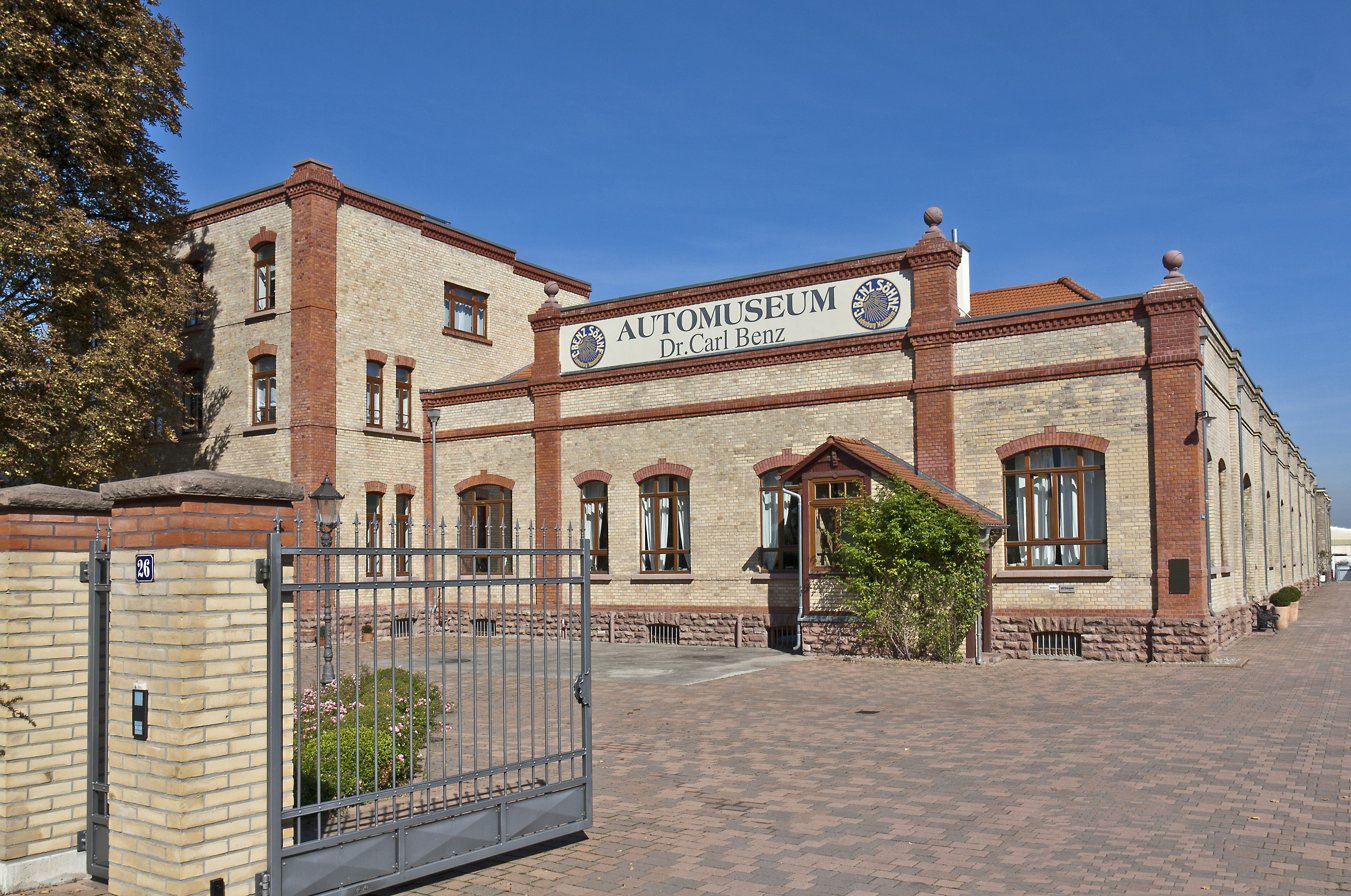
- The museum building

- Location within Baden-Württemberg Location within Germany
- Established: 1984; 42 years ago
- Location: Ilvesheimer Straße 26; 68526 Ladenburg; Germany
- Coordinates: 49°28′28″N 08°35′48″E
- Type: Automobile museum
- Website: Automuseum Dr. Carl Benz (in German)

The Automuseum Dr. Carl Benz is a privately owned automobile museum in Ladenburg, Baden-Württemberg, Germany. Established in 1984, it focuses on the career of the automotive pioneer Carl Benz (also known as Karl Benz), and on the history of the automobile manufacturers associated with him. Since 2005, the museum has been housed in a former factory building used from 1908 to produce automobiles under the "C. Benz Söhne" brand.

== See also ==
- List of automobile museums
- Mercedes-Benz Museum
- Museum for Historical Maybach Vehicles
