= Mercedes-Benz =

German luxury automotive brand

- Product type: Automotive
- Current owner: Mercedes-Benz AG (passenger cars and light commercial vehicles); Daimler Truck (heavy commercial vehicles)
- Country: Germany
- Introduced: 28 June 1926; 100 years ago
- Tagline: "The best or nothing."
- Website: mercedes-benz.com

Mercedes-Benz AG
- Type: Subsidiary
- Industry: Automotive
- Predecessor: Mercedes-Benz division of Daimler AG
- Founded: November 2019; 7 years ago
- Headquarters: Stuttgart, Germany
- Area served: Worldwide
- Key people: Ola Källenius (chairman of the board of management and CEO)
- Products: Automobiles; Light commercial vehicles
- Production output: 2,164,187 cars worldwide (2020)
- Brands: Mercedes-Benz; Mercedes-EQ; Mercedes-Maybach
- Services: Financial services; Automobile repair
- Parent: Mercedes-Benz Group
- Divisions: Mercedes-Benz Cars; Mercedes-Benz Vans
- Subsidiaries: Mercedes-AMG; Smart Automobile (50%)
- Website: mercedes-benz.com

Mercedes-Benz (German pronunciation: [mɛʁˌtseːdəs ˈbɛnts, -dɛs -]), (Note: "Mercedes" is frequently pronounced /ˈmərseɪdiz/ in English, though this is technically incorrect) commonly referred to simply as Mercedes and occasionally as Benz, is a German luxury automotive brand that was founded in 1926. Mercedes-Benz AG (a subsidiary of the Mercedes-Benz Group, established in 2019) is based in Stuttgart, Baden-Württemberg, Germany. Mercedes-Benz AG manufactures luxury vehicles and light commercial vehicles, all branded under the Mercedes-Benz name. From November 2019 onwards, the production of Mercedes-Benz-branded heavy commercial vehicles (trucks and buses) has been managed by Daimler Truck, which separated from the Mercedes-Benz Group to form an independent entity at the end of 2021.

In 2018, Mercedes-Benz became the world's largest premium vehicle brand, with a sales volume of 2.31 million passenger cars.

The roots of the brand trace back to the 1901 Mercedes by Daimler-Motoren-Gesellschaft and the 1886 Benz Patent-Motorwagen and 1894 Benz Velo by Carl Benz, which is widely recognised as the first automobile powered by an internal combustion engine. The brand’s slogan is "The Best or Nothing".

== History ==
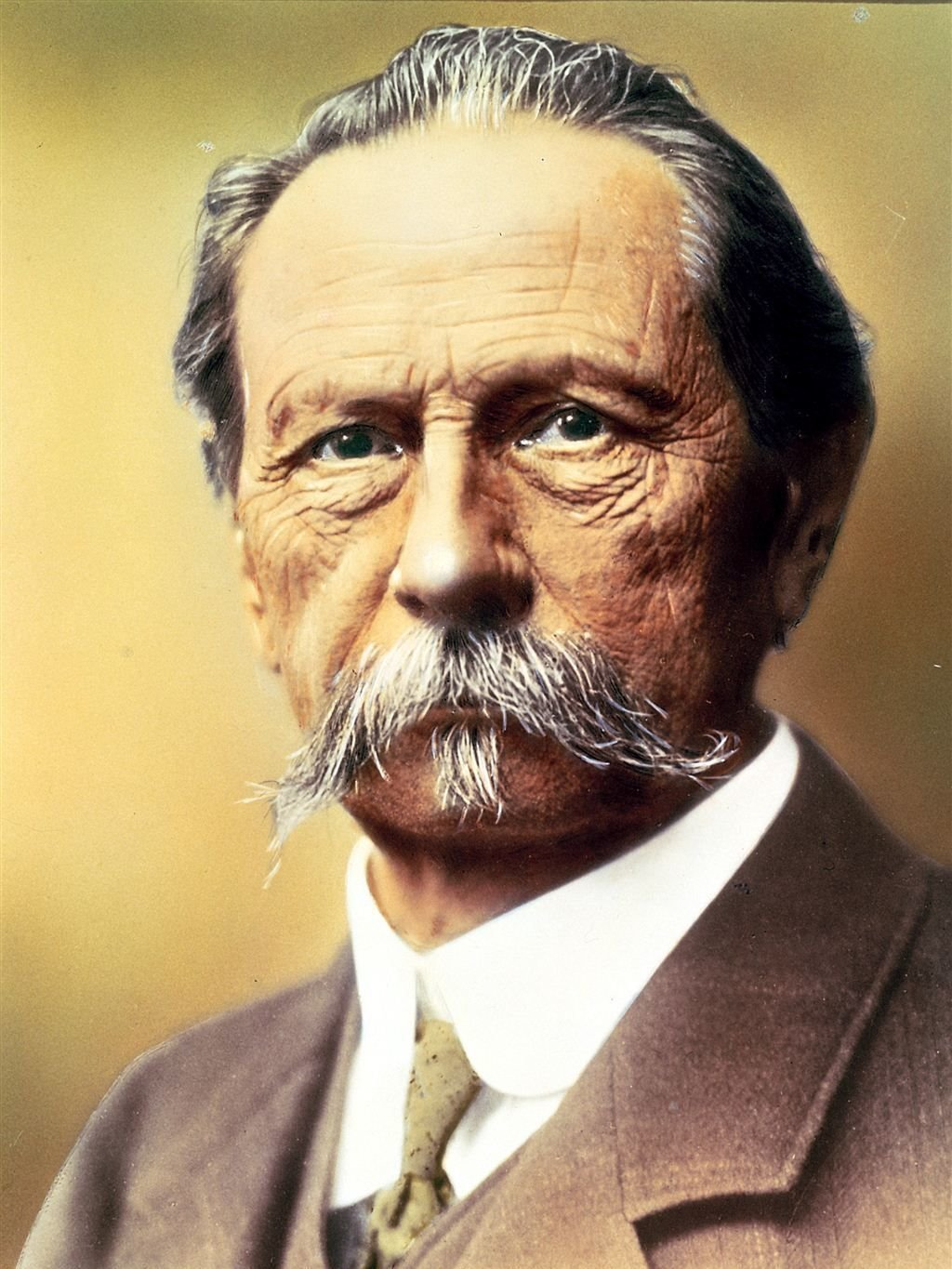
Carl Benz (1844–1929) made the 1886 Benz Patent Motorwagen, which is widely regarded as the first automobile.

Mercedes-Benz traces its origins to Carl Benz's first internal combustion engine in a car, seen in the Benz Patent-Motorwagen – financed by Bertha Benz's dowry and patented in January 1886 – and Gottlieb Daimler and its engineer Wilhelm Maybach's conversion of a stagecoach, with the addition of a petrol engine, introduced later that year. The Mercedes automobile was first marketed in 1901 by Daimler Motoren Gesellschaft (DMG).

Emil Jellinek, an Austrian automobile entrepreneur who worked with DMG, registered the trademark in 1902, naming the 1901 Mercedes 35 hp after his daughter Mercédès Jellinek. Jellinek was a businessman and marketing strategist who promoted "horseless" Daimler automobiles among the highest circles of society. At the time, it was a meeting place for the haute volée of France and Europe, especially in winter. His customers included the Rothschild family and other wealthy clients, but as early as 1901, he was selling Mercedes cars in the "New World" as well, including to billionaires Rockefeller, Astor, Morgan, and Taylor. At the Nice race he attended in 1899, Jellinek drove under the pseudonym "Monsieur Mercédès". Many consider that race the birth of Mercedes-Benz as a brand. In 1901, the name "Mercedes" was re-registered by DMG worldwide as a protected trademark. The first Mercedes-Benz branded vehicles were produced in 1926, following the merger of Karl Benz and Gottlieb Daimler's companies into the Daimler-Benz company on 28 June of the same year.

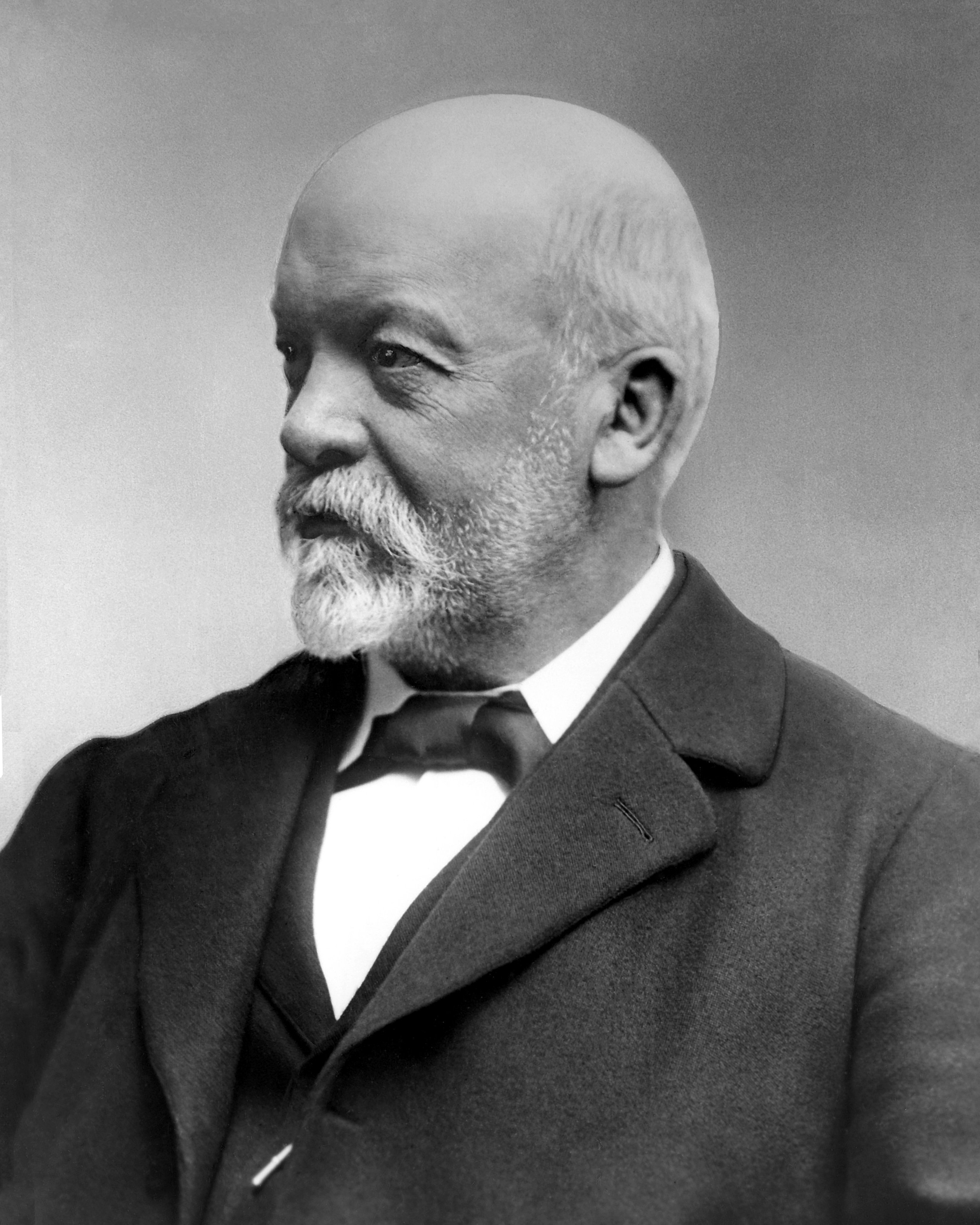
Gottlieb Daimler (1834–1900) – founder of Daimler Motoren Gesellschaft

Gottlieb Daimler was born on 17 March 1834 in Schorndorf. After training as a gunsmith and working in France, he attended the Polytechnic School in Stuttgart from 1857 to 1859. After completing various technical activities in France and England, he started working as a draftsman in Geislingen in 1862. At the end of 1863, he was appointed workshop inspector at a machine-tool factory in Reutlingen, where he met Wilhelm Maybach in 1865.

Throughout the 1930s, Mercedes-Benz produced the 770 model, a car that was notably popular throughout Germany's Nazi period. Adolf Hitler was known to have driven in a model of this car during his time in power, with modified custom bulletproof windshields. However, most of the currently surviving 770 models were sold at auctions due to private buyers. One of the cars is currently on display at the War Museum in Ottawa, Ontario.

From 1937 onward, Daimler Benz focused increasingly on military products such as the LG3000 lorry and the DB600 and the DB601 aero engines. To build the latter, in 1936, it built a factory hidden in the forest at Genshagen around 10 km south of Berlin. By 1942, the company had mostly stopped producing cars, and was now devoted to war production. According to its own statement, in 1944, almost half of its 63,610 employees were forced labourers, prisoners of war, or concentration-camp detainees. Another source quotes this figure at 46,000. The company later paid $12 million in reparations to the labourers' families.

In 1958, the two companies began a partnership to sell its cars in the United States with Studebaker. A few American-based Daimler Benz dealerships were converted into Mercedes-Benz dealerships when Daimler's non-Mercedes-partnered company closed in 1966.

Over the decades, Mercedes-Benz has introduced many electronic and mechanical innovations and safety features that later became common. Currently, Mercedes-Benz is one of the best-known and longest-standing automotive brands in the world. The pontiff's Popemobile has often been sourced from Mercedes-Benz.

In November 2019, Daimler AG announced that Mercedes-Benz, until that point a company marque, would be spun off into a separate, wholly owned subsidiary called Mercedes-Benz AG. The new subsidiary would manage the Mercedes-Benz car and van business. Mercedes-Benz-badged trucks and buses would be part of the Daimler Truck AG subsidiary.

For information relating to the three-pointed star symbol of the brand, see under the title Daimler-Motoren-Gesellschaft, including the merger into Daimler-Benz.

In May 2022, Mercedes-Benz announced that it had recently sold the most expensive car at the price of $142 million (€135 million). The car is a very rare 1955 Mercedes-Benz SLR that has been kept in the German automaker's collection and bought by a private owner. Mercedes in an announcement said that the sale will be used to establish the Mercedes-Benz Fund.

In June 2022, Mercedes-Benz recalled almost one million vehicles built between 2004 and 2015, due to potential problems with their braking system, caused by possible "advanced corrosion".

== Subsidiaries and alliances ==
As of the Daimler AG company split, the Mercedes-Benz Cars division now handled the Mercedes-Benz- and the Smart-branded cars' production.

=== Mercedes-AMG ===
Mercedes-AMG became a majority-owned division of Mercedes-Benz in 1999. The company was integrated into DaimlerChrysler in 1999, and became Mercedes-Benz AMG on 1 January 1999.

=== Mercedes-Maybach ===
Daimler's ultra-luxury Maybach brand was under the Mercedes-Benz Cars division until December 2012, when production was stopped due to decreased sales. It now exists under the Mercedes-Maybach name, with the models being luxury-focused, enhanced models of Mercedes-Benz cars, such as the 2016 Mercedes-Maybach S600. The Mercedes-Maybach GLS 600 SUV debuted in November 2019.

=== China ===
Daimler partnered with BYD Auto to make and sell a battery-electric car called Denza in China. However, after reducing its stake in 2021, the Stuttgart-based company has now exited Denza completely: the Mercedes-Benz Group is no longer involved in the Chinese car brand Denza, as it sold its last ten per cent stake in Denza in July 2024. In 2016, Daimler announced plans to sell Mercedes-Benz-badged fully electric battery cars in China. Beijing Benz is a joint venture with the BAIC Group to produce the Mercedes-Benz branded cars in China.

=== Vietnam ===
Established in 1995, Mercedes-Benz Vietnam became a joint venture between Saigon Mechanical Engineering Corporation (SAMCO) and Daimler AG. Daimler AG assembles various Mercedes-Benz models from CKD kits at its factory in Ho Chi Minh City. The factory is a joint venture with Saigon Mechanical Engineering Corporation. In 2021–2022, Mercedes-Benz Vietnam invested approximately 33 million USD to upgrade six departments at this factory in preparation for the assembly of AMG models. The 1996 Mercedes E230 was the first model produced by the Mercedes-Benz Vietnam assembly plant and was part of the initial batch assembled locally.

== Production ==
=== Factories ===
Other than in its native birthplace, Germany, Mercedes-Benz vehicles are or have been partly manufactured or assembled in:

Sovereign state	Continent	Note
Algeria	Africa	Manufactures buses and trucks in cooperation with SNVI (Actros, Zetros, Unimog, G-Class, and Sprinter).
Argentina	South America	Manufactures buses, trucks, the Vito and the Sprinter van. This is the first Mercedes-Benz factory outside of Germany. Built in 1951.
Australia	Australia	Various models were assembled at the Australian Motor Industries facility in Port Melbourne from 1959 to 1965.
Austria	Europe	G-Class
Bosnia and Herzegovina	Europe	
Brazil	South America	Manufactures trucks and buses. Established in 1956. The A-Class (W168) was produced from 1999 to 2005 and the C-Class was produced until 2010 as well.
Canada	North America	Fuel cell plant in Burnaby, British Columbia, opened 2012.
Colombia	South America	Assembly of buses, Established in Soacha 2012 and Funza 2015
China	Asia	Beijing Benz, manufactures A-Class, C-Class, E-Class, GLA, GLB, GLC, EQA, EQB, EQE and EQE SUV for mainland China market.
Denmark	Europe	Bohnstedt-Petersen A/S assembled the models 130 and W136 between 1935 and 1955, although no production took place during the Second World War. Between 1955 and 1966 the models W120, W121 and W110, together with the van L319 and a number of trucks and buses, were assembled by the company in Hillerød. Assembly of special variants of Mercedes-Benz trucks continued until 1984.
Egypt	Africa	Via Egyptian German Automotive Company E-Class, C-Class and GLK
Finland	Europe	Valmet Automotive, New A-series (W176) is manufactured in Uusikaupunki since late 2013, being the first Mercedes-Benz passenger car ever built in that country.
Hungary	Europe	Manufacturing plant in Kecskemét, making B-Class and CLA.
Jordan	Middle East	Bus company factory, Elba House, Amman.
India	Asia	Pune (C-Class, E-Class, S-Class, GLA, GLE and some AMG models). Chennai (Daimler India Commercial Vehicles Pvt. Ltd.) Buses, Trucks & Engine Manufacturing unit, Bangalore (R&D), Jamshedpur with Tata Motors at Tata Motors.
Indonesia	Asia	Wanaherang (A-Class, C-Class, E-Class, S-Class, GLA, GLC, GLE, GLS, and select entry level AMG models). Operated by a joint venture between Inchcape plc and Indomobil. Cikarang (Axor, Buses). Operated by Daimler Commercial Vehicles Indonesia.
Iran	Asia	
Malaysia	Asia	Assembly of C, E and S class vehicles by DRB-HICOM.
Mexico	North America	Mercedes-Benz Mexico fully manufactures some Mercedes and Daimler vehicles completely from locally built parts (C-Class, E-Class, M-Class, International trucks, Axor, Atego, and Mercedes Buses), manufactures other models in complete knock down kits (CL-Class, CLK-Class, SL-Class, SLK-Class) and manufactures a select number of models in semi knockdown kits which use both imported components and locally sourced Mexican components (S-Class, CLS-Class, R-Class, GL-Class, Sprinter).
Nigeria	Africa	Assembly of buses, trucks, utility motors and the Sprinter van
Russia	Eurasia	Joint venture Mercedes-Benz Car Trucks Vostok in Naberezhnye Chelny (jointly Kamaz). Available in trucks Actros, Axor, multi-purpose auto four wheel drive medium trucks Unimog. Mercedes-Benz Sprinter Classic is also produced in Russia.
Serbia	Europe	FAP produces Mercedes-Benz trucks under license.
Spain	Europe	Factory at Vitoria-Gasteiz Mercedes-Benz Vito, Viano and V-Class have been built there.
South Africa	Africa	The assembly plant is located in East London, in the Eastern Cape province, where both right and left hand versions of the C-class are built.
South Korea	Asia	Mercedes-Benz Musso and MB100; Ssangyong Rexton Mercedes-Benz models manufactured by SsangYong Motor Company.
Taiwan	Asia	Assembly of Actros by the Shung Ye Group
Thailand	Asia	Completely Knocked Down (CKD) production of A, GLA, C, E, S Classes and Semi-Knocked Down (SKD) production of C-coupe, GLC, GLC-coupe, GLE and CLS. Additionally, local production of Mercedes-AMG such as C43, E53 and CLS53 have been integrated to the existing production lines. The factory is operated by contract manufacturer Thonburi Group under supervision of Mercedes-Benz Manufacturing (Thailand).
Turkey	Eurasia	Mercedes-Benz Türk A.Ş. Some of Mercedes-Benz busses like "Travego" and "Tourismo" were built at Hoşdere plant. Apart from manufacturing, R-D and aftersales were also available.
United Kingdom	Europe	The SLR sports car was built at the McLaren Technology Centre in Woking. Brackley, Northamptonshire, is home to the Mercedes Grand Prix factory, and Brixworth, Northamptonshire is the location of Mercedes AMG High Performance Powertrains.
United States	North America	The Mercedes-Benz GLE-Class Sport Utility, the full-sized GL-Class Luxury Sport Utility and the Mercedes-Benz C-Class vehicles are all built at the Mercedes-Benz U.S. International production facility near Tuscaloosa, Alabama. Trucks (6,000 per year in the early eighties) were once assembled in Hampton, Virginia.
Vietnam	Asia	Assembly of E-Class, C-Class, S-Class, GLK-Class and Sprinter. Established in 1995.

=== Quality rankings ===
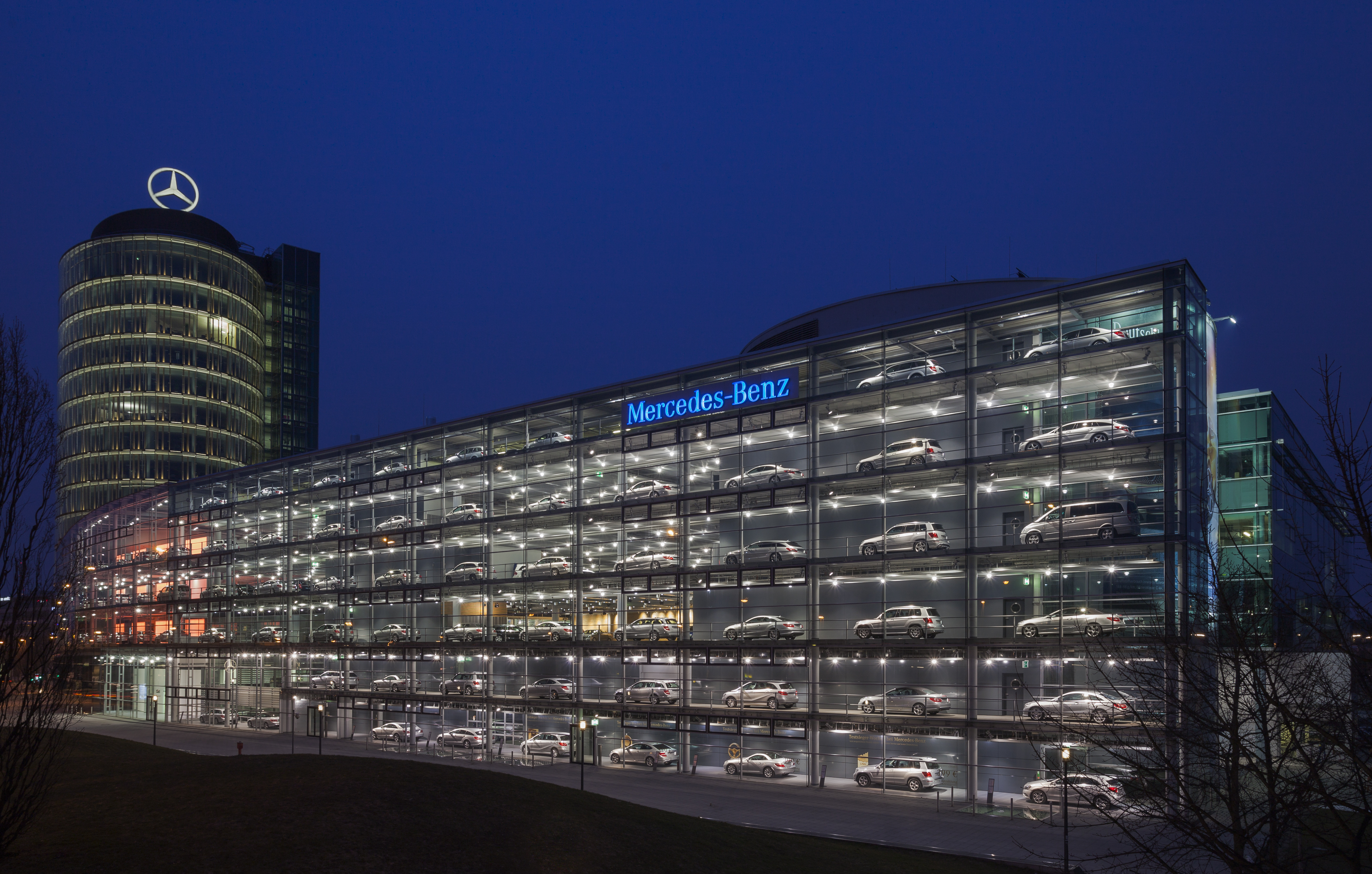
Mercedes-Benz dealer in Munich, Germany

Before the mid 1990s, Mercedes-Benz had a very strong reputation for quality and durability. Mercedes-Benz's passenger cars were considered "tanks" or "indestructible" by owners who had their own Mercedes for very long periods. Some objective reviewers looking at passenger vehicles, such as J. D. Power surveys, demonstrated a downturn in reputation by these criteria in the late 1990s and early 2000s. By mid-2005, Mercedes temporarily returned to the industry average for initial quality, a measure of problems after the first 90 days of ownership, according to J. D. Power. In J. D. Power's Initial Quality Study for the first quarter of 2007, Mercedes showed dramatic improvement by climbing from 25th to 5th place and earning several awards for its newer models. For 2008, Mercedes-Benz's initial quality rating improved by yet another mark, to 4th place. On top of this accolade, it also received the Platinum Plant Quality Award for its Mercedes branded Sindelfingen, Germany body assembly plant. J. D. Power's 2011 US Initial Quality and Vehicle Dependability Studies both ranked Mercedes-Benz vehicles above average in build quality and reliability. In J. D. Power's United Kingdom Survey in 2011, Mercedes cars were rated above average. Additionally, iSeeCars.com study for Reuters in 2014 found Mercedes to have the lowest vehicle recall rate out of competitors.

== Models ==
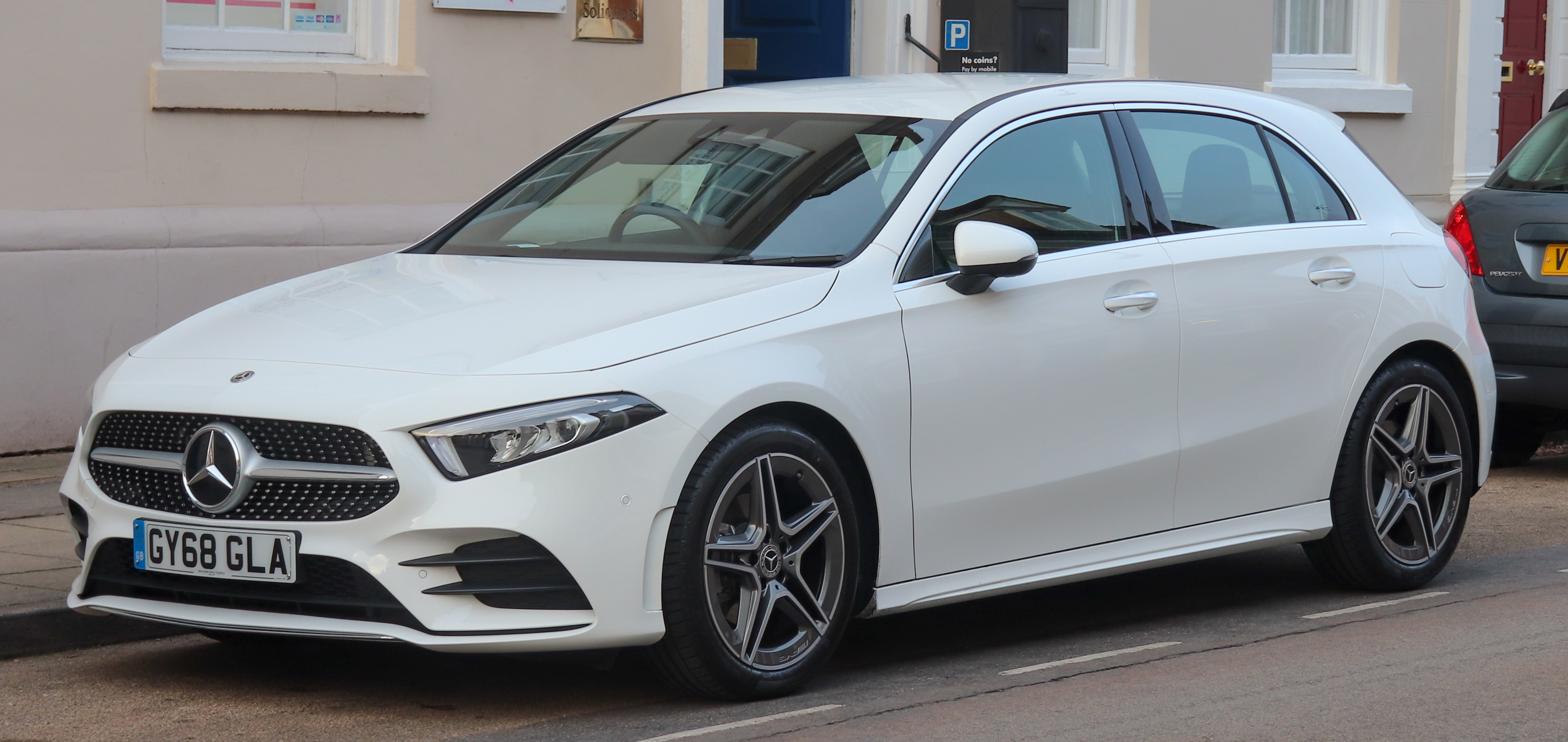
Mercedes-Benz A-Class (subcompact executive hatchbacks and sedans)

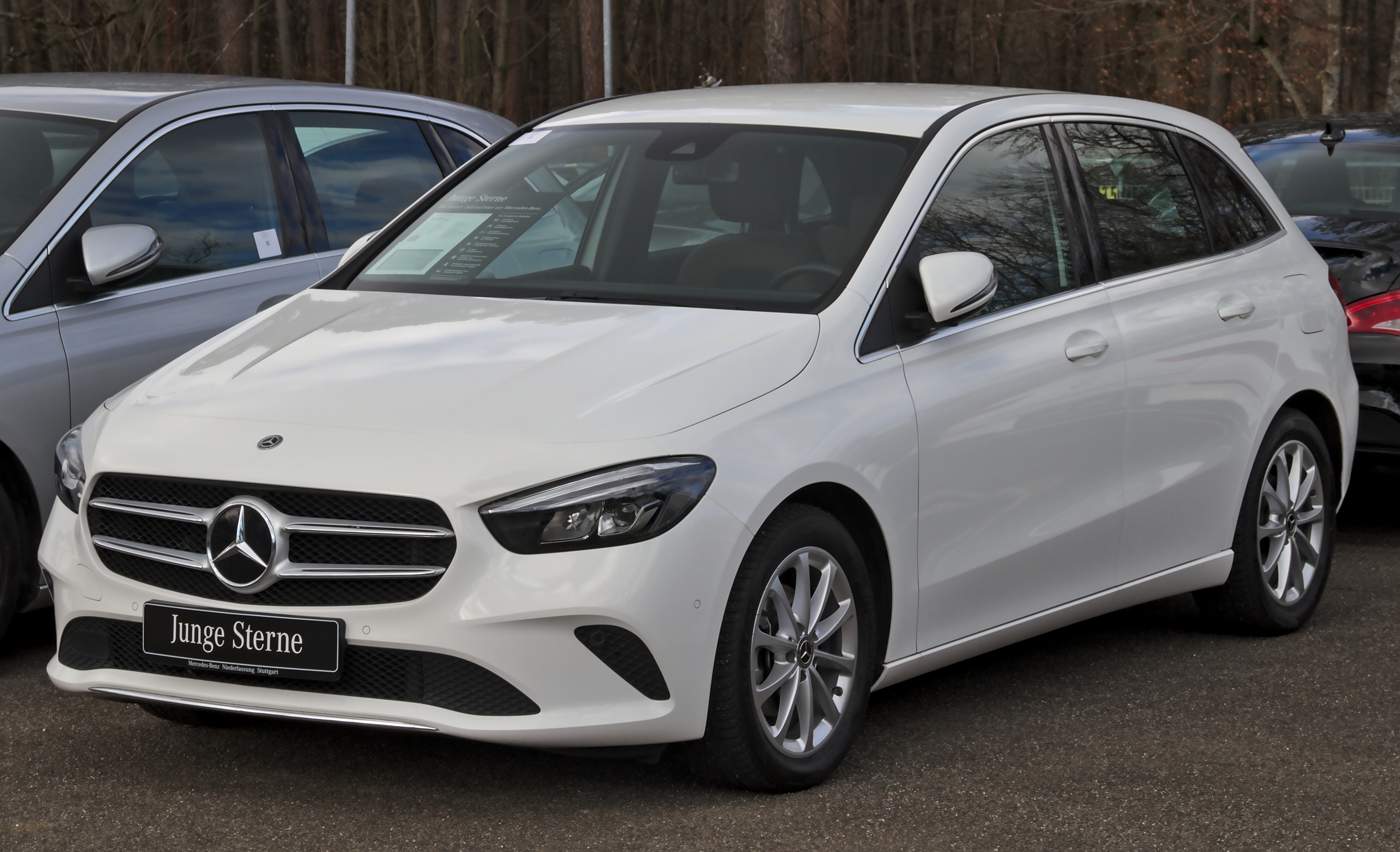
Mercedes-Benz B-Class (subcompact executive Tourers)

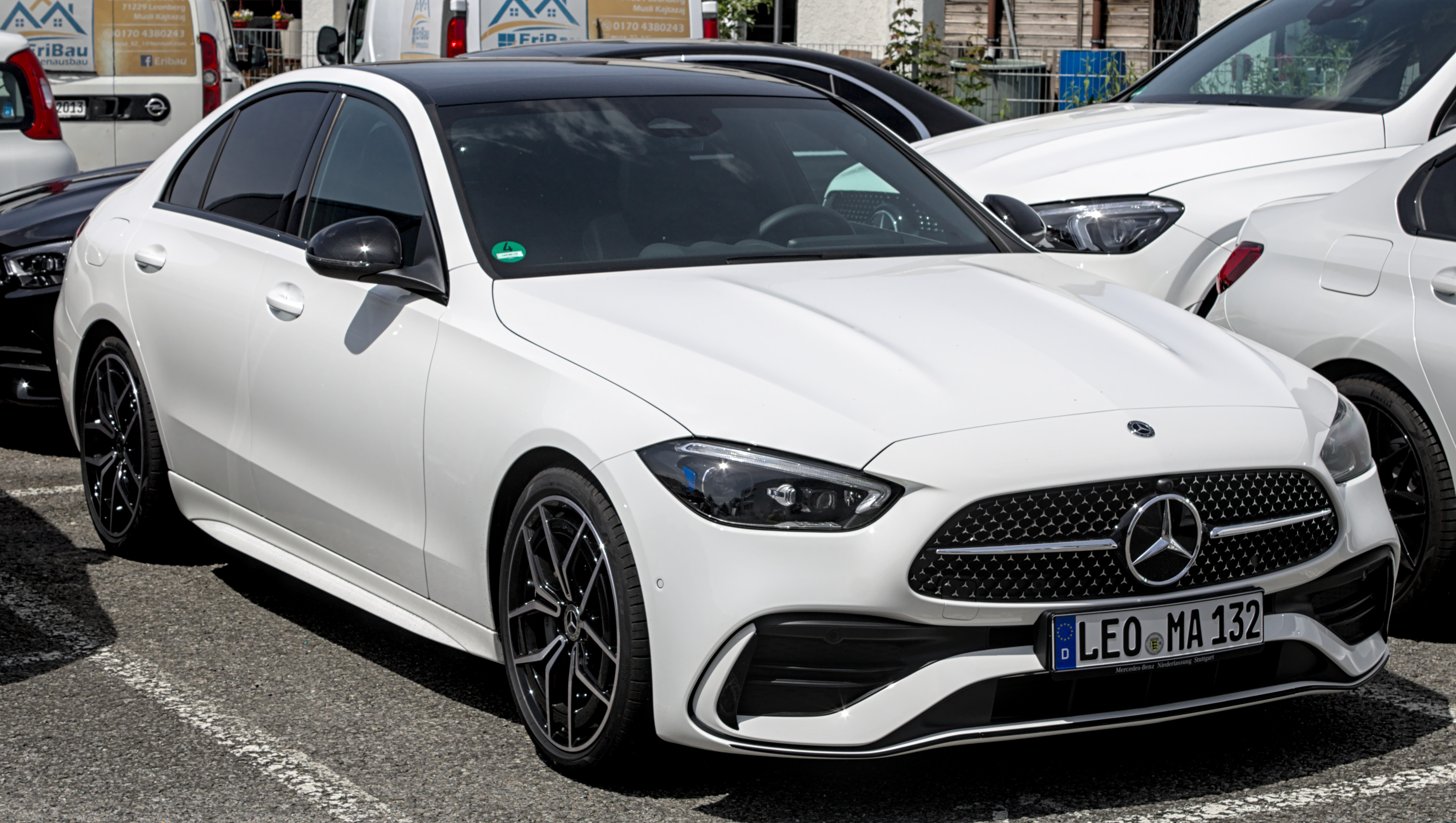
Mercedes-Benz C-Class (compact executive car)

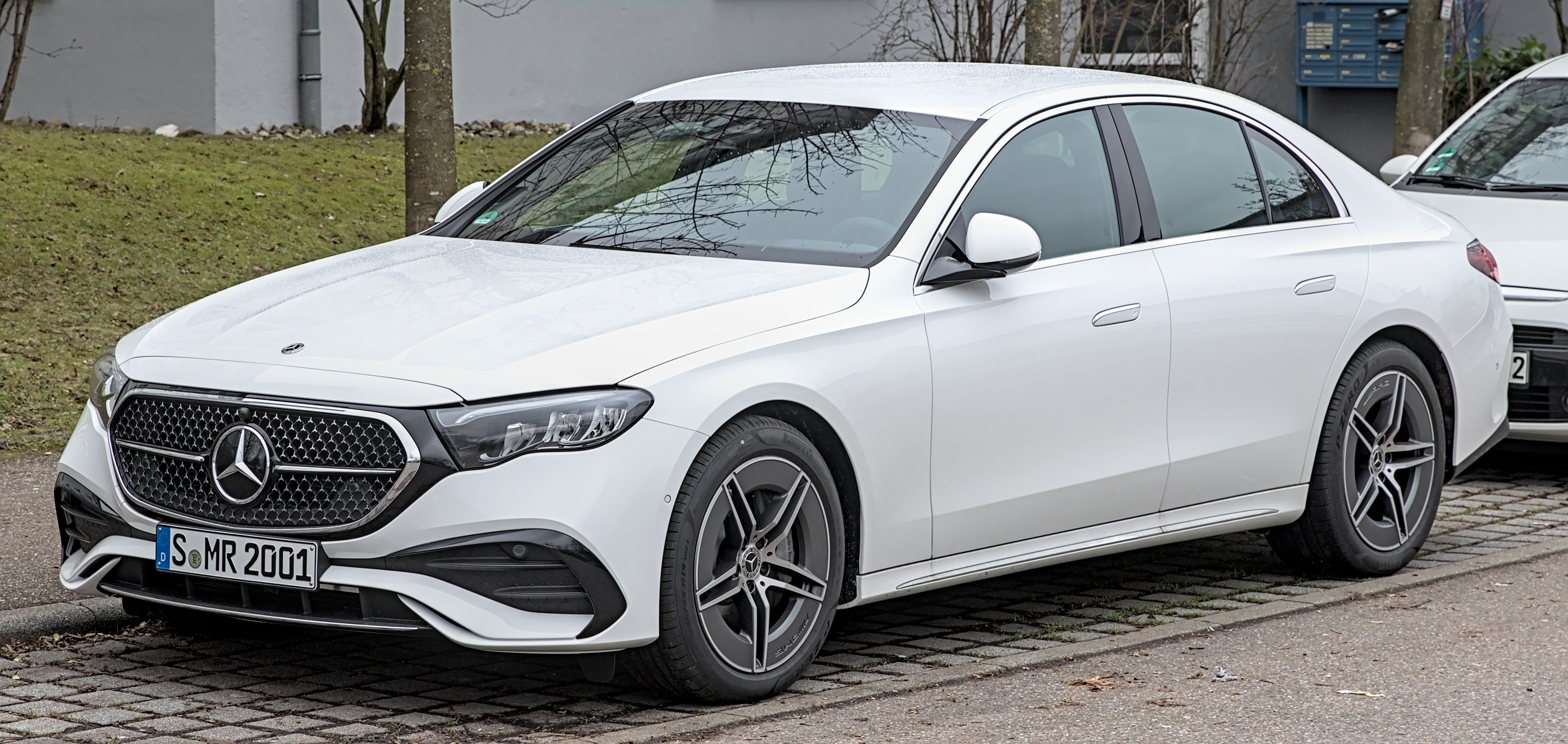
Mercedes-Benz E-Class (executive car)

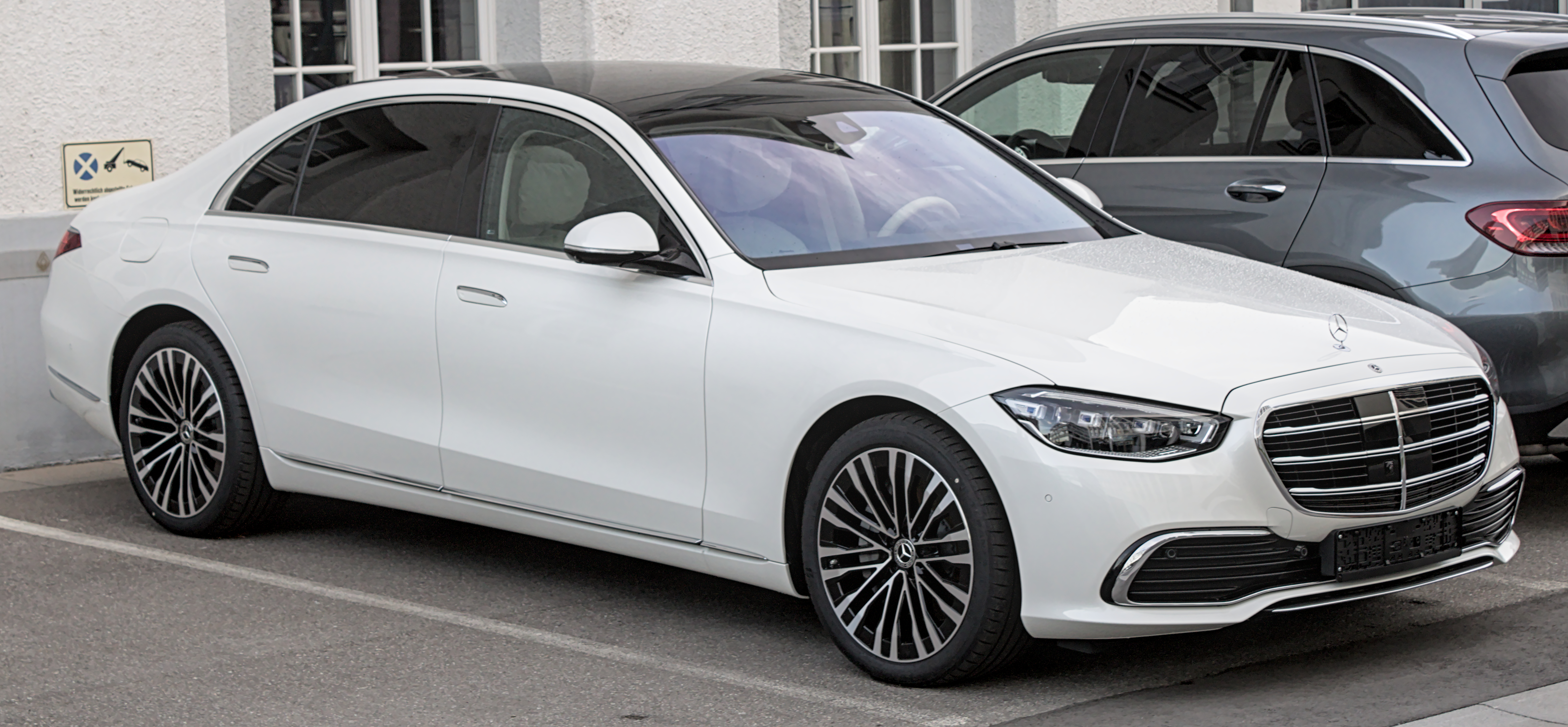
Mercedes-Benz S-Class (full-size luxury sedan)

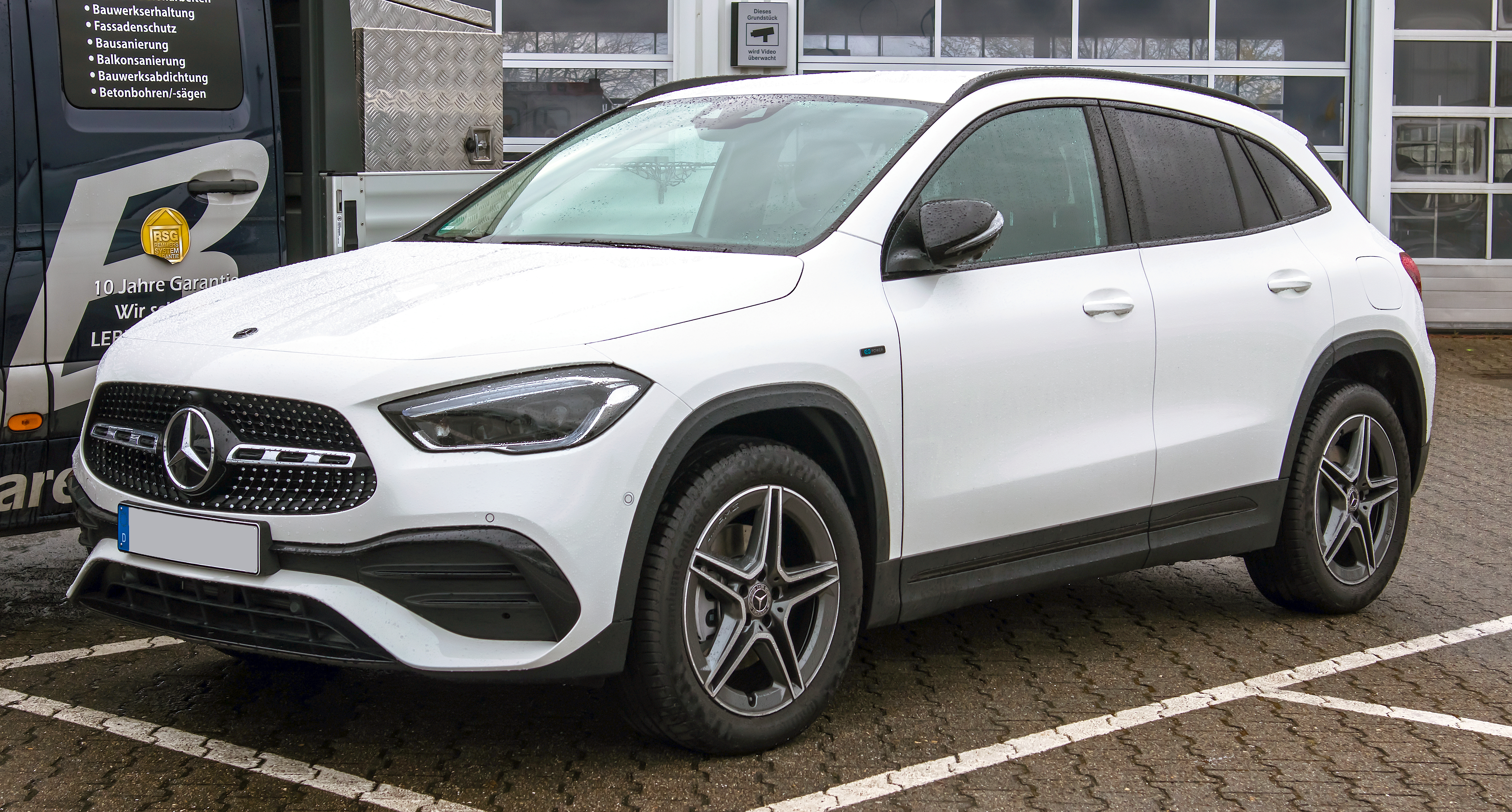
Mercedes-Benz GLA-Class (subcompact luxury SUV)

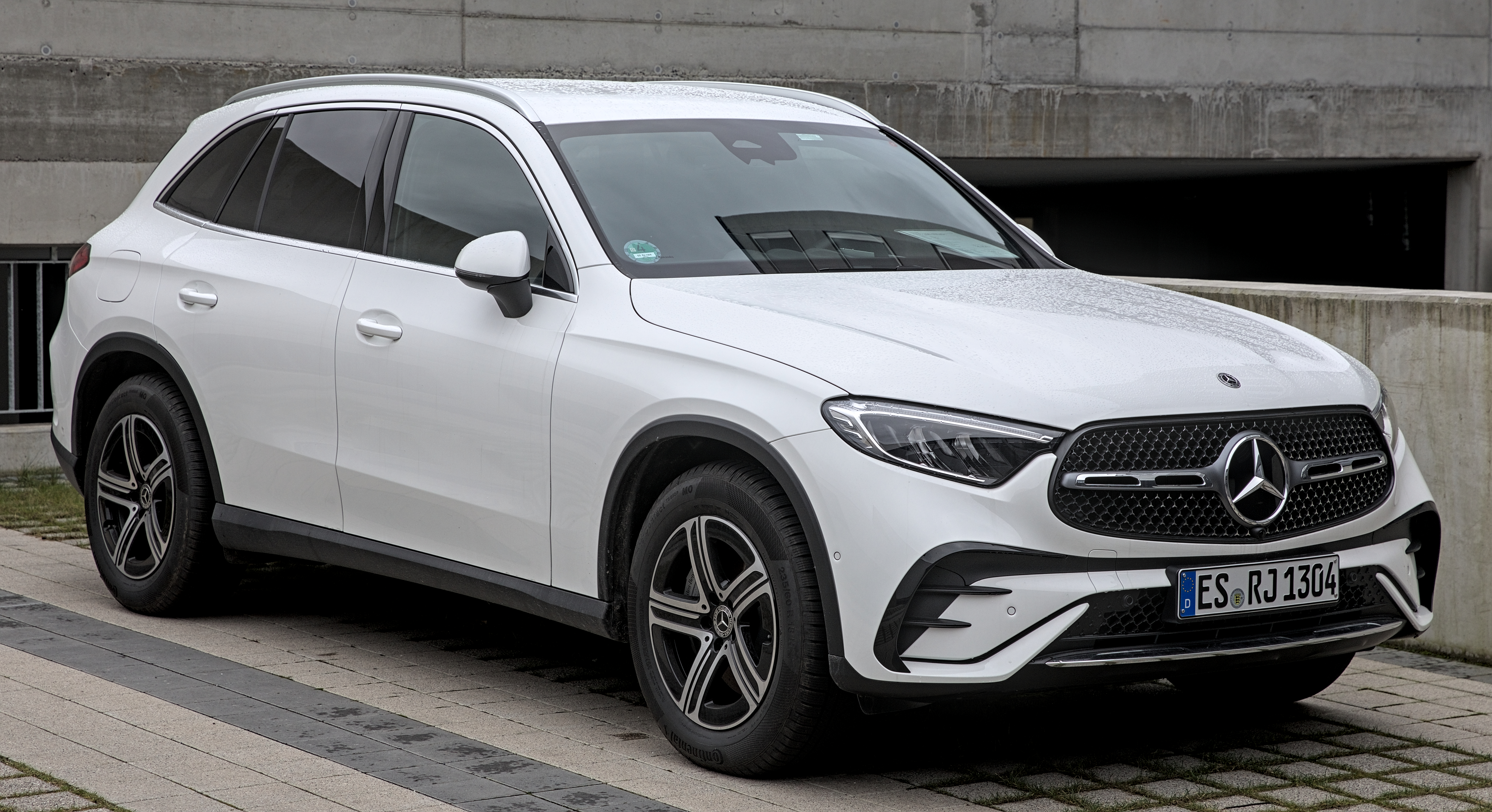
Mercedes-Benz GLC-Class (compact luxury SUV)

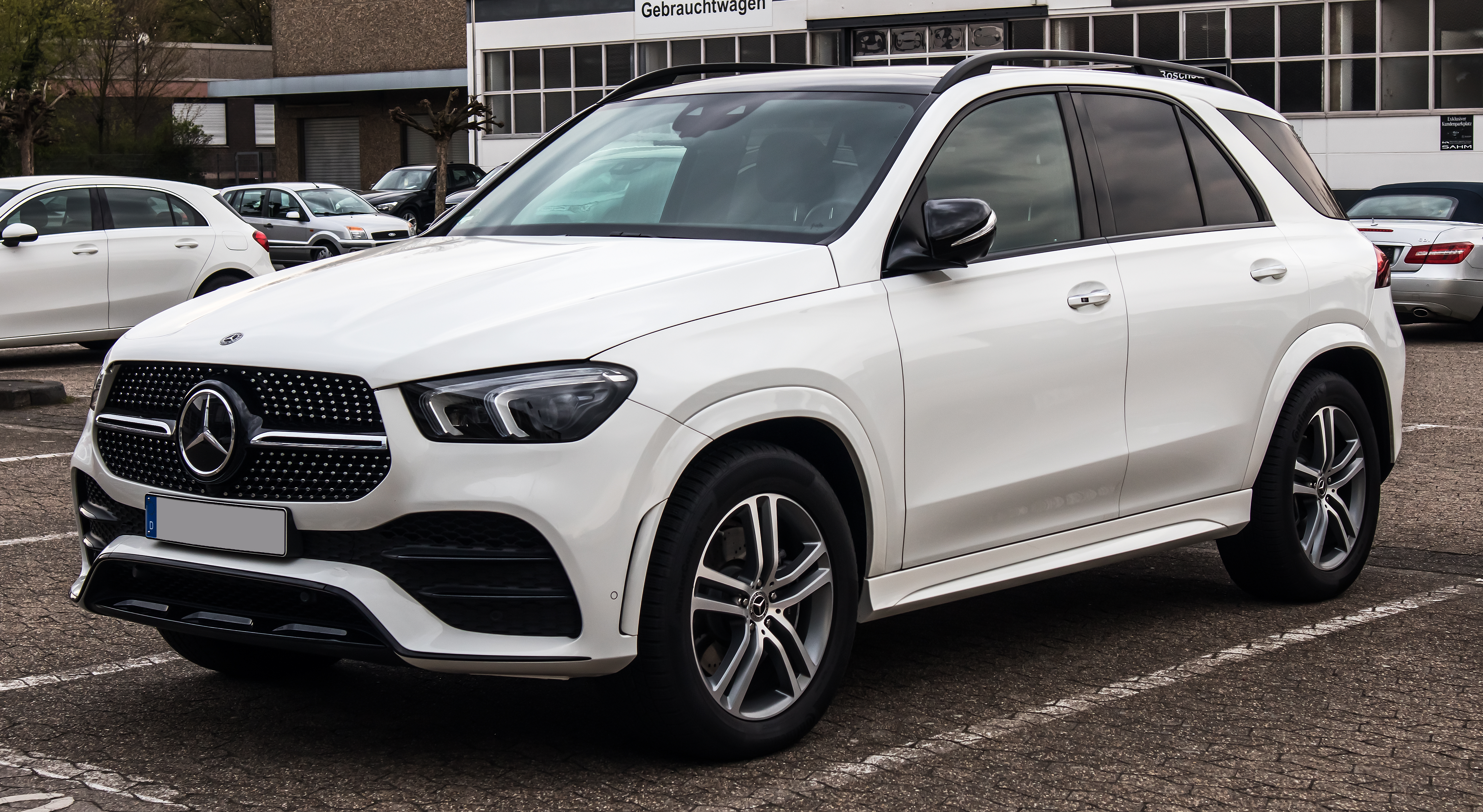
Mercedes-Benz GLE-Class (mid-size luxury SUV)

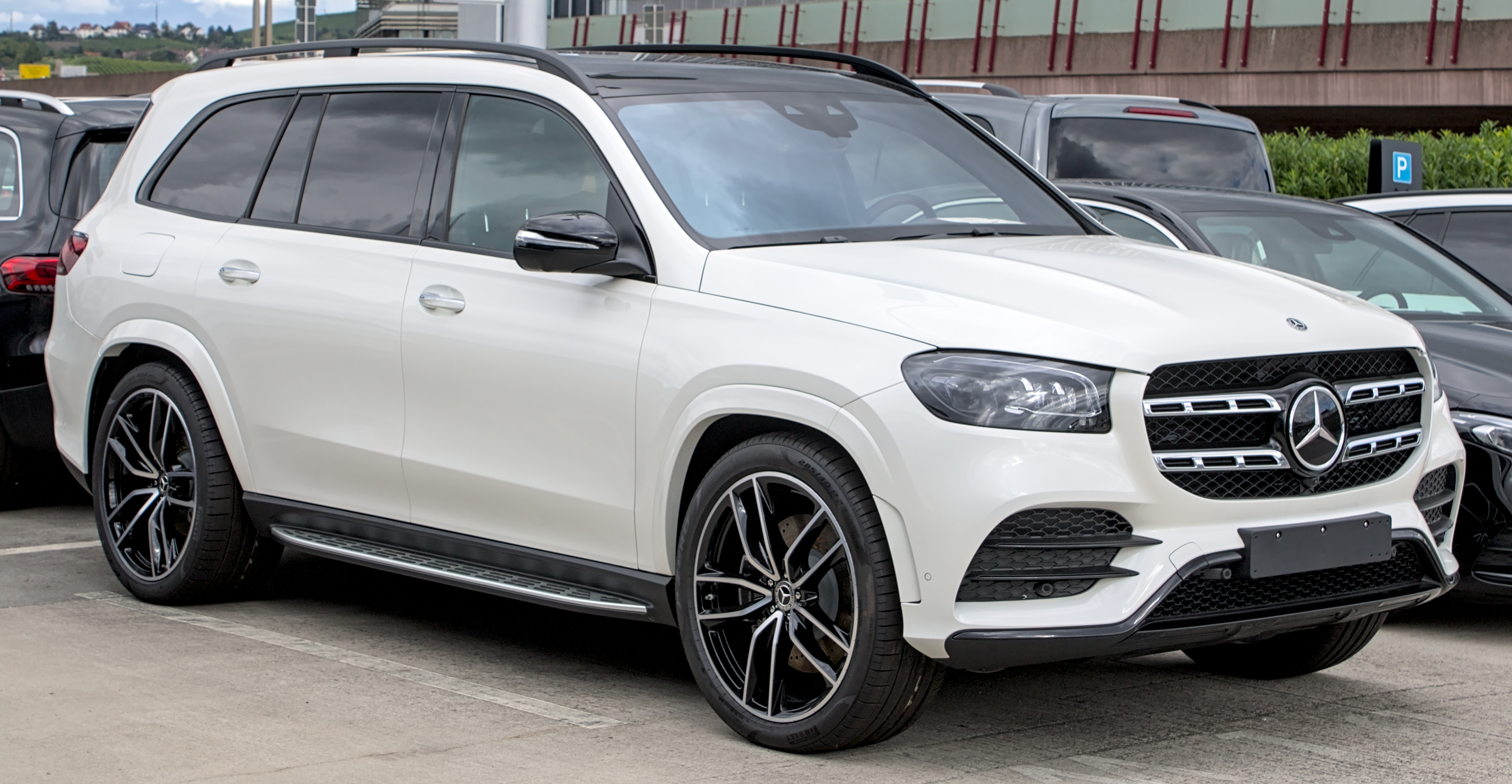
Mercedes-Benz GLS-Class (full-size luxury SUV)

=== Current model range ===
Mercedes-Benz currently offers a range of consumer-passenger, light commercial and heavy commercial equipment, which are manufactured in multiple countries worldwide. The Smart marque of city cars are also produced by Daimler AG.

==== Automobiles ====
- A-Class – C-segment hatchback and saloon
- B-Class – C-segment hatchback
- C-Class – D-segment saloon and estate
- CLA – C-segment saloon and estate
- CLE – E-segment coupé and cabriolet
- E-Class – E-segment saloon and estate
- G-Class – Off-road vehicle
- GLA – C-segment crossover SUV
- GLB – D-segment crossover SUV
- GLC – D-segment crossover SUV
- GLE – E-segment crossover SUV
- GLS – F-segment crossover SUV
- S-Class – F-segment saloon
- T-Class – M-segment compact MPV
- V-Class – M-segment large MPV
- AMG GT – S-segment coupé and roadster
- AMG GT 4-Door – E-segment liftback
- AMG SL – S-segment roadster
- AMG ONE – S-segment supercar
- EQA – C-segment electric crossover SUV
- EQB – D-segment electric crossover SUV
- EQE – E-segment saloon
- EQE SUV – E-segment electric crossover SUV
- EQS – F-segment electric liftback
- EQS SUV – F-segment electric crossover SUV
- EQT – M-segment electric compact MPV
- EQV – M-segment electric large MPV

==== Vans ====
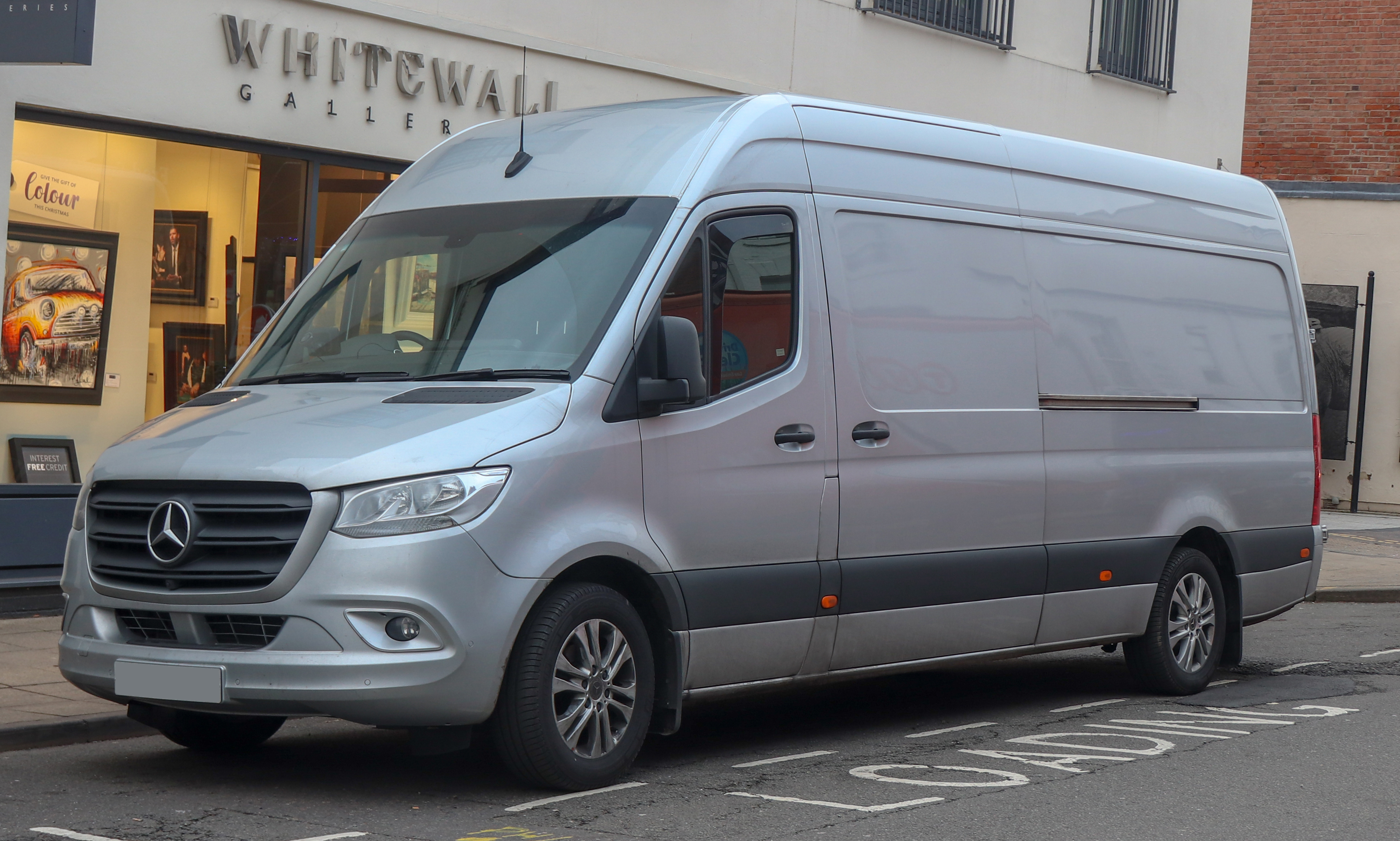
Mercedes-Benz Sprinter

Mercedes-Benz currently offers three types of vans; Citan, Vito, and Sprinter. They are all produced by Daimler AG.

==== Trucks ====
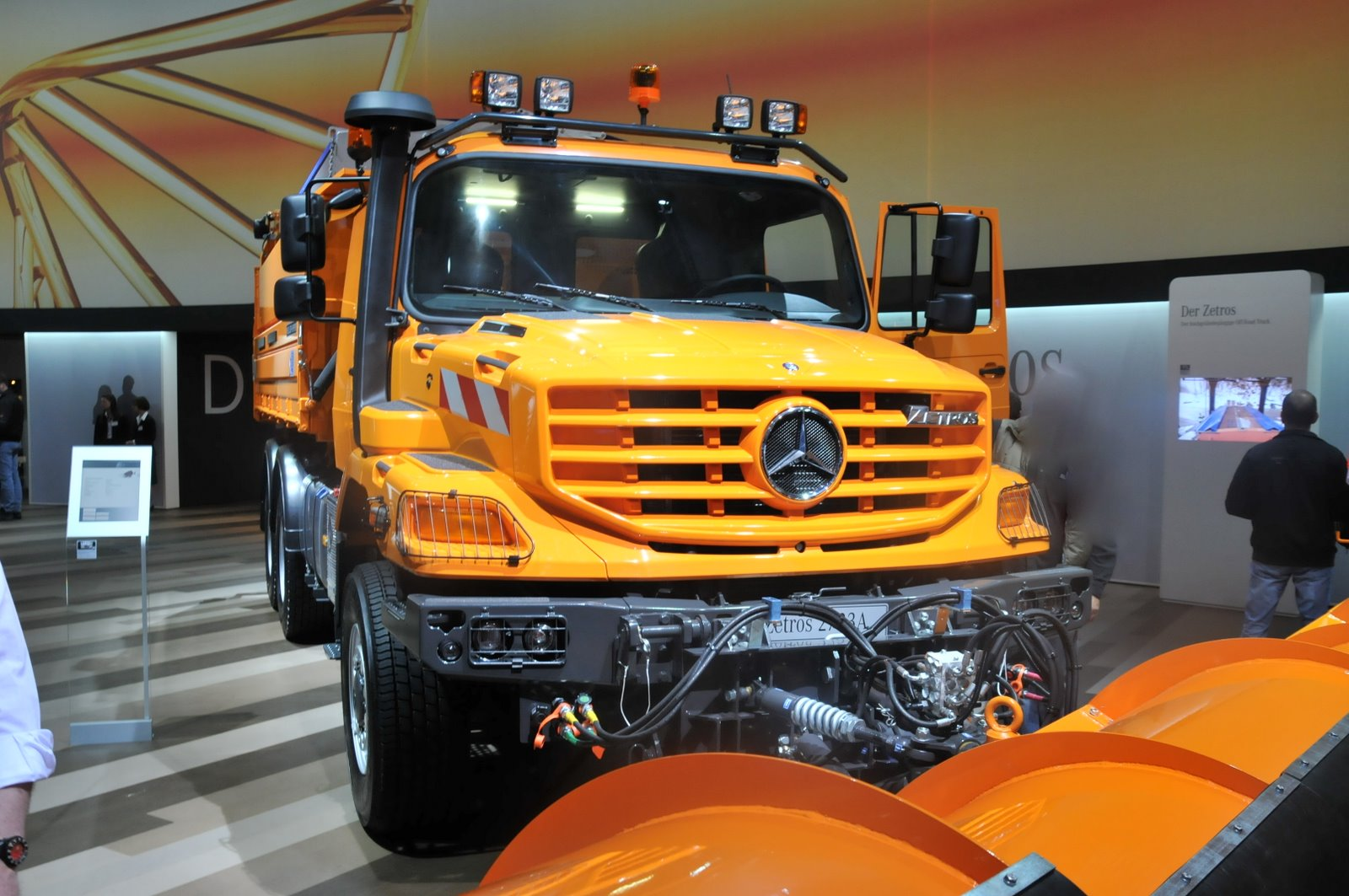
Mercedes-Benz Zetros used for snowplowing

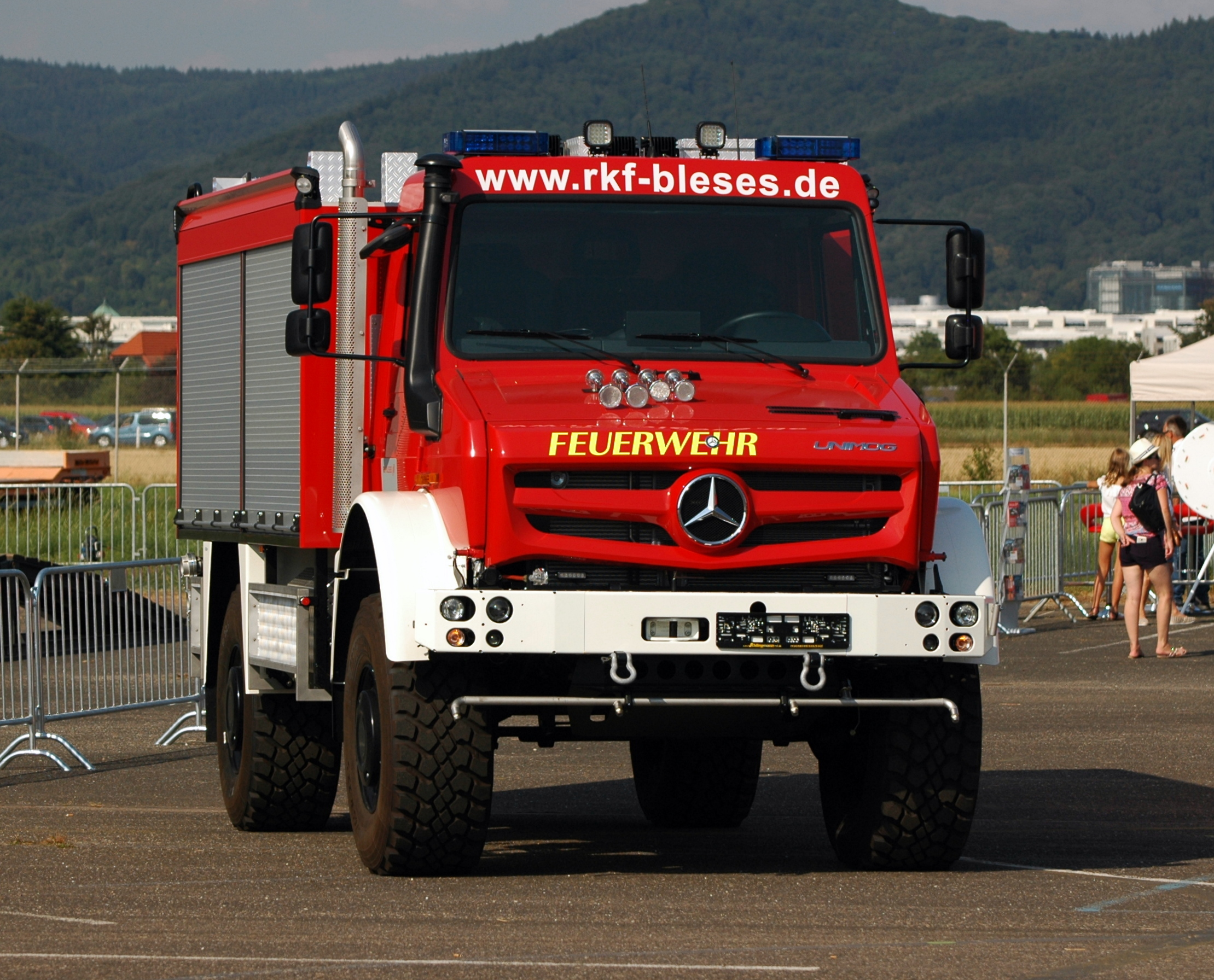
Unimog, a famous allround vehicle by Mercedes-Benz

Since December 2021, the Mercedes-Benz Trucks division is part of the Daimler Truck company and includes other sub-companies that were part of the DaimlerChrysler merger. Gottlieb Daimler sold the world's first truck in 1886. Their first factory to be built outside Germany after World War II was in Argentina. They originally built trucks, many of which were modified by third parties to be used as buses, popularly named Colectivo.

==== Buses ====
Mercedes-Benz has been producing buses since 1895 in Mannheim, Germany. Since 1995, the brands of Mercedes-Benz's buses and coaches are under the umbrella of EvoBus GmbH, since December 2021 belonging to Daimler Truck AG. EvoBus, through its regional subsidiaries, markets them in European countries, while in other regions of the world marketing and sales duties are passed to regional subsidiaries of Daimler Truck. Mercedes-Benz produces a wide range of buses and coaches, mainly for Europe and Asia. The first model was produced by Karl Benz in 1895.

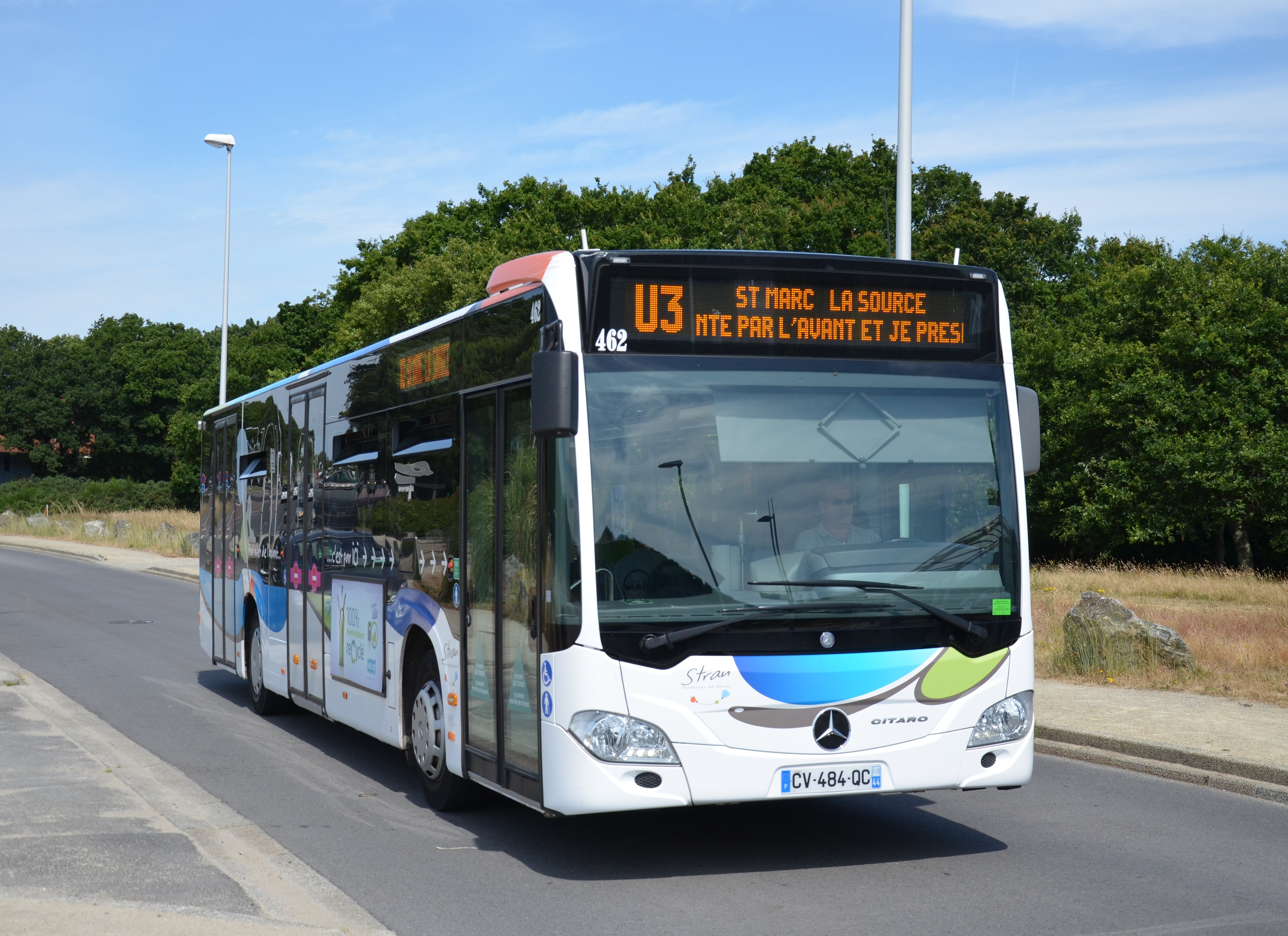
A STRAN Citaro (second generation) in June 2014

=== Significant models produced ===
- 1928: SSK racing car
- 1930: 770 "Großer Mercedes" state and ceremonial car
- 1934: 500 K
- 1936: 260 D World's first diesel production car
- 1936: 170
- 1938: W125 Record-breaking experimental
- 1939: 320A
- 1951: 300, known as the "Adenauer Mercedes"
- 1953: "Ponton" models
- 1954: 300SL "Gullwing"
- 1956: 190SL
- 1959: "Fintail" models
- 1960: 220SE Cabriolet
- 1963: 600 "Grand Mercedes"
- 1963: 230SL "Pagoda"
- 1965: S-Class
- 1966: 300SEL 6.3
- 1968: W114 "new generation" compact cars
- 1969: C111 experimental vehicle
- 1972: 350SL, 350SLC
- 1974: 450SEL 6.9
- 1977: W123 – Mercedes' first station wagon
- 1978: 300SD – Mercedes' first turbo diesel
- 1979: 500SEL and G-Class
- 1983: 190E 2.3–16
- 1989: 300SL, 500SL
- 1990: 500E
- 1991: 600SEL
- 1993: C-Class
- 1995: C43 AMG
- 1995: SL73 AMG, 7.3 V12
- 1996: SLK
- 1997: A-Class and M-Class
- 2004: SLR McLaren and CLS-Class
- 2007: BlueTec E320, GL320 Bluetec, ML320 Bluetec, R320 Bluetec
- 2010: SLS AMG
- 2013: CLA-Class
- 2016: AMG GT
- 2019: EQ
- 2021: EQA
- 2022: EQS and AMG ONE

The Mercedes-Benz 600 or 600S Pullman Guard limousines offer the option of armour-plating and have been used by diplomats worldwide.

=== Car nomenclature ===
==== Pre-1994 ====
Until 1994, Mercedes-Benz utilized an alphanumeric system for categorizing its vehicles, consisting of a number sequence approximately equal to the engine's displacement in liters multiplied by 100, followed by an arrangement of alphabetical suffixes, indicating body style and engine type.

- "C" indicates a coupe or cabriolet body style (for example, the CL and CLK models, though the C-Class is an exception, since it is also available as a sedan or station wagon).
- "D" indicates the vehicle is equipped with a diesel engine.
- "E" (for "Einspritzung") indicates the vehicle's engine is equipped with petrol fuel injection. Also used for electric models and plug-in hybrids.
- "G" was originally used for the Geländewagen off-road vehicle, but is now applied to Mercedes SUVs in general (G, GLA, GLC, GLE, GLK, and GLS).
- "K" was used in the 1930s, indicating a supercharger ("Kompressor") equipped engine. Three exceptions : the SLK, SSK and CLK, where K indicates "Kurz" (short-wheelbase) (though the SLK and SSK had a supercharger).
- "L" indicates "Leicht" (lightweight) for sporting models and "Lang" (long-wheelbase) for sedan models.
- "R" indicates "Rennen" (racing), used for racing cars (for example, the 300SLR).
- "S" Sonderklasse "Special class" for flagship models, including the S-Class, SLR McLaren, and SLS sports cars.
- "T" indicates "Touring" and an estate (or station wagon) body style.

Some models in the 1950s also had lower-case letters (b, c, and d) to indicate specific trim levels. For other models, the numeric part of the designation does not match the engine displacement. This was done to show the model's position in the model range independent of displacement or in the price matrix. For these vehicles, the actual displacement in litres is suffixed to the model designation. An exception was the 190-class with the numeric designation of "190" as to denote its entry-level in the model along with the displacement label on the right side of the boot (190E 2.3 for 2.3-litre 4-cylinder petrol motor, 190D 2.5 for 2.5-litre 5-cylinder diesel motor, and so forth). Some older models (such as the SS and SSK) did not have a number as part of the designation at all.

==== 1994 to 2014 ====
For the 1994 model year, Mercedes-Benz revised the naming system. Models were divided into "classes" denoted by an arrangement of up to three letters (see "Current model range" above. This in turn is followed by a three-digit (two-digit for AMG models) number related to the engine displacement as before. Variants of the same model such as an estate version or a vehicle with a diesel engine are no longer given a separate letter. The SLR and SLS supercars do not carry a numerical designation.

Some models carry further designations indicating special features:

- "4MATIC" indicates the vehicle is equipped with all-wheel-drive.
- "BlueTEC" indicates a diesel engine with selective catalytic reduction exhaust after-treatment.
- "BlueEFFICIENCY" indicates special fuel economy features (direct injection, start-stop system, aerodynamic modifications, etc.)
- "CGI" (Charged Gasoline Injection) indicates direct petrol injection.
- "CDI" (Common-rail Direct Injection) indicates a common-rail diesel engine.
- "Hybrid" indicates a petrol- or diesel-electric hybrid.
- "NGT" indicates a natural gas-fuelled engine.
- "Kompressor" indicates a supercharged engine.
- "Turbo" indicates a turbocharged engine, only used on A-, B-, E- and GLK-Class models.
- "AMG Line" indicates the interior or engine, depending which car, has been fitted with the luxuries of its AMG sports cars.

Model designation badges can be removed at the request of the customer.

==== 2015 and beyond ====
Rationalisation of the model nomenclature was announced in November 2014 for future models. The changes consolidate many confusing nomenclature and their placements in the model range.

The new nomenclature was originally divided into four segments: core models; off-road vehicles and SUVs; 4-door coupés, and roadsters. Other segments were unaffected, and the Mercedes-EQ line was introduced in 2016.

Segment	Nomenclature	Example
Core models	A, B, C, E, or S	E-Class
Off/road vehicles/SUVs	"GL" + the core equivalent	GLE
4-door coupés	"CL" + the core equivalent	CLE
Roadsters	the core equivalent + "L"	SL
Electric vehicles	"EQ" + the core equivalent	EQE

Under this new nomenclature, the GLK-Class became the GLC, the M-Class became the GLE, and the GL-Class became the GLS. The CL-Class became the S-Class Coupé, which has since been discontinued. Another model, the X-Class (based on the Nissan Navara pickup truck) was produced from 2017 to 2020.

The numerical trim designation was kept from the previous nomenclature. However, many numerical designations no longer reflect the engine's actual displacement, but more of the relative performance and marketing position. For example, the GLC 300 actually has a 2.0-litre engine. Recent AMG models use the "63" designation (in honour of the 1960s 6.3-litre M100 engine) despite being equipped with either a 6.2-litre (M156), a 5.5-litre (M157) or even a 4.0-litre engine.

In addition to the revised nomenclature, Mercedes-Benz has new suffix nomenclature for the drive systems:

Previous	New	Example
Natural Gas Drive	c for "compressed natural gas"	B 200 c
BlueTec CDI	d for "diesel"	E 350 d GLA 200 d
PLUG-IN HYBRID Electric Drive	e for "electric"	S 500 e B 250 e
Fuel Cell	f for "fuel cell"	B 200 f
HYBRID BlueTEC HYBRID	h for "hybrid"	S 400 h E 300 h
4MATIC	4MATIC (all-wheel drive)	E 400 4MATIC

The revised A45 AMG for the 2016 model year on has shifted the model designation to the right side while AMG is on the left side. This trend commenced with Mercedes-Maybach with MAYBACH on the left and S500/S600 on the right.

=== Environmental record ===
Mercedes-Benz has developed multi-concept cars with alternative propulsion, such as hybrid-electric, fully electric, and fuel-cell powertrains. At the 2007 Frankfurt motor show, Mercedes-Benz showed seven hybrid models, including the F700 concept car, powered by a hybrid-electric drivetrain featuring the DiesOtto engine. In 2009, Mercedes-Benz displayed three BlueZERO concepts at the North American International Auto Show. Each car features a different powertrain – battery-electric, fuel-cell electric, and petrol-electric hybrid. In the same year, Mercedes also showed the Vision S500 PHEV concept with a 19 miles (31 km) all-electric range and CO_{2} emissions of 74 grams/km in the New European Driving Cycle.

Since 2002, Mercedes-Benz has developed the F-Cell fuel cell vehicle. The current version, based on the B-Class, has a 250-mile range and is available for lease, with volume production scheduled to begin in 2014. Mercedes has also announced the SLS AMG E-Cell, a fully electric version of the SLS sports car, with deliveries expected in 2013. The Mercedes-Benz S400 BlueHYBRID was launched in 2009, and is the first production automotive hybrid in the world to use a lithium-ion battery. In mid-2010, production commenced on the Vito E-Cell all-electric van.

In 2008, Mercedes-Benz announced that it would have a demonstration fleet of small electric cars in two to three years. Mercedes-Benz and Smart are preparing for the widespread uptake of electric vehicles (EVs) in the UK by beginning the installation of recharging points across its dealer networks. So far 20 Elektrobay recharging units, produced in the UK by Brighton-based Elektromotive, have been installed at seven locations as part of a pilot project, and further expansion of the initiative is planned later in 2010.

In the United States, Mercedes-Benz was assessed a record US$30.66 million fine for its decision to not meet the federal corporate average fuel economy standard in 2009. Certain Mercedes-Benz cars, including the S550 and all AMG models sold in the United States, also face an additional gas guzzler tax. However, newer AMG models fitted with the M157 engine will not be subject to the gas-guzzler tax, due to improved fuel economy, and newer models powered by the M276 and M278 engines will have better fuel economy. In 2008, Mercedes also had the worst CO_{2} average of all major European manufacturers, ranking 14th out of 14 manufacturers. Mercedes was also the worst manufacturer in 2007 and 2006 in terms of average CO_{2} levels, with 181 g and 188 g of CO_{2} emitted per km, respectively.

Mercedes-Benz paid an additional US$38 million for failing to meet its CAFE standards for model years 2008–2011.

In May 2017, Mercedes partnered with Vivint Solar to develop a solar-energy home storage battery.

In February 2018, it was announced that Mercedes cabin air filters earned the Asthma and Allergy Friendly Certification.

=== Electric cars ===
Mercedes opened its sixth battery factory in 2018. Critics deemed the marque's EQS sedan a tough competitor to Tesla, Inc. The six factories are established across three continents.

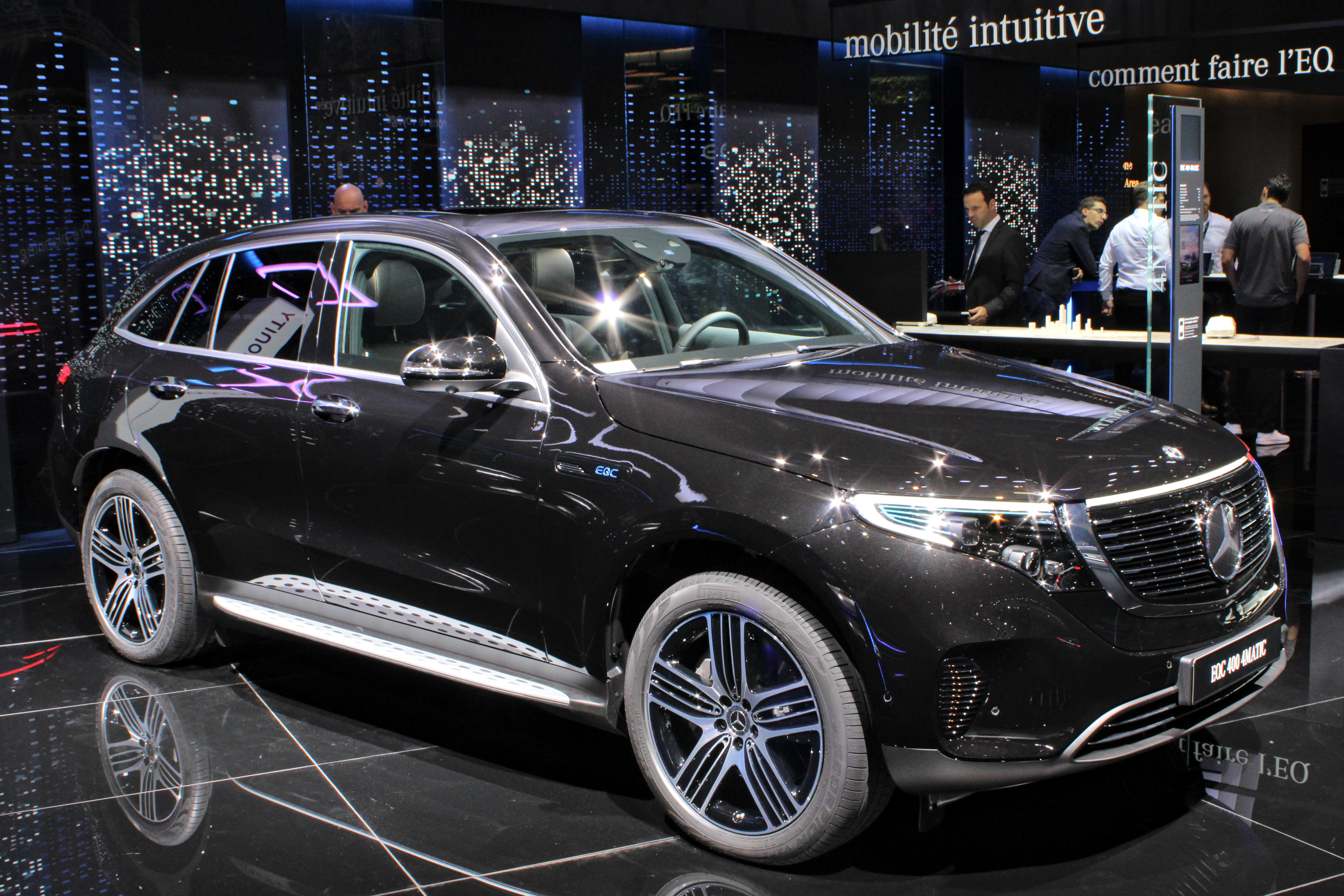
Mercedes-Benz EQC

The brand has also launched its electric EQ brand with the EQC SUV which was set for production in the year 2019. In September 2018, Mercedes unveiled the EQC, its first fully electric car, at an event in Stockholm.

Mercedes unveiled the VISION AVTR at the 2020 Consumer Electronics Show in Las Vegas. The car was inspired by the 2009 science fiction film Avatar. Whilst the AVTR is a concept car, it is said to "hold clues on features bound for next-generation Mercedes-Benz cars".

2022 will be the year in which Daimler has said that the company will have invested $11 billion to ensure that every Mercedes-Benz has a fully electric or hybrid version available on the market.

While releasing details of the project, Markus Schäfer said—

Our electric vehicles will be built in six plants on three continents. We address every market segment: from the smart fortwo seater to the large SUV. The battery is the key component of e-mobility. As batteries are the heart of our electric vehicles we put a great emphasis on building them in our own factories. With our global battery network, we are in an excellent position: As we are close to our vehicle plants we can ensure the optimal supply of production. In case of a short-term high demand in another part of the world our battery factories are also well prepared for export. The electric initiative of Mercedes-Benz Cars is right on track. Our global production network is ready for e-mobility. We are electrifying the future.

After Audi declared that it would cut more than 9,000 jobs by 2025, the owner of Mercedes-Benz announced that the company will shed around 10,000 jobs worldwide to focus on electric cars.

In January 2021, Mercedes-Benz revealed its new electric SUV, the EQA, which will have a range of 426 kilometres and be on sale in Europe starting 4 February.

== Motorsport ==
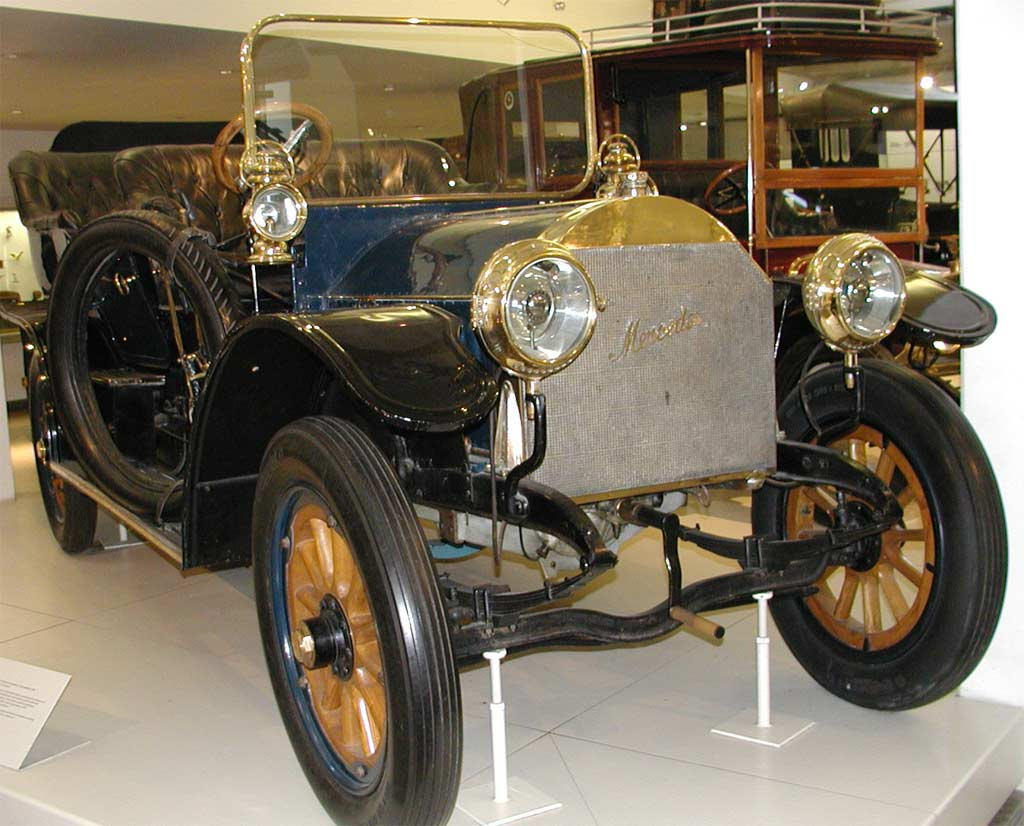
A DMG Mercedes Simplex 1906 in the Deutsches Museum

The two companies which were merged to form the Mercedes-Benz brand in 1926 had both already enjoyed success in the new sport of motor racing throughout their separate histories. A single Benz competed in the world's first motor race, the 1894 Paris–Rouen, where Émile Roger finished 14th in 10 hours 1 minute. Throughout its long history, the company has been involved in a range of motorsport activities, including sports car racing and rallying. On several occasions, Mercedes-Benz has withdrawn completely from motorsport for a significant period, notably in the late 1930s, and after the 1955 Le Mans disaster, where a Mercedes-Benz 300 SLR rammed another car (an Austin-Healey), took off into the stands, and killed more than 80 spectators. Stirling Moss and co-driver Denis Jenkinson won the 1955 Mille Miglia road race in Italy during a record-breaking drive with an average speed of almost 98 mph in a Mercedes-Benz 300 SLR.

Although there was some activity in the intervening years, it was not until 1987 that Mercedes-Benz returned to front line competition, returning to Le Mans, Deutsche Tourenwagen Meisterschaft (DTM), and Formula One with Sauber. The 1990s saw Mercedes-Benz partner with British engine builder Ilmor (now Mercedes-Benz High Performance Engines), and campaign IndyCars under the USAC/CART rules, eventually winning the 1994 Indianapolis 500 and 1994 CART IndyCar World Series Championship with Al Unser Jr. at the wheel. The 1990s also saw the return of Mercedes-Benz to GT racing with the Mercedes-Benz CLK GTR, which took the company to two titles in FIA's GT1 class.

Mercedes-Benz is currently active in two motorsport categories, Formula One and GT racing.

=== Formula One ===
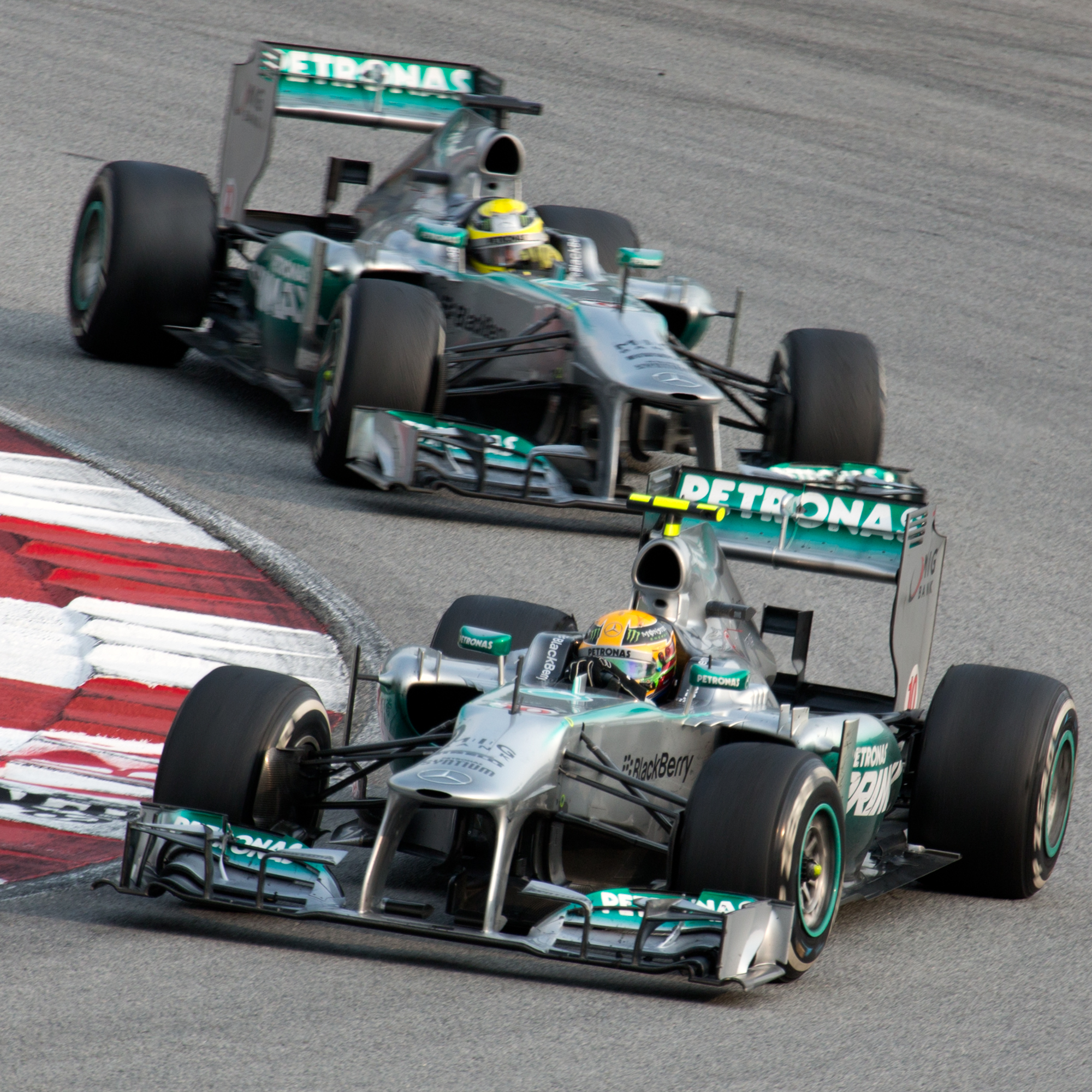
Both Mercedes-AMG Formula One cars at the 2013 Malaysian Grand Prix

Mercedes-Benz took part in the world championship in 1954 and 1955, but despite being successful with two championship titles for Juan-Manuel Fangio, the company left the sport after just two seasons.

Mercedes-Benz returned as an engine manufacturer in 1994, with the engines being designed and manufactured by Ilmor in Brixworth. It initially partnered with Sauber, before switching to McLaren in 1995. Although the Mercedes engines were not successful at first, it later won drivers' championships for Mika Häkkinen in 1998 and 1999, and for Lewis Hamilton in 2008, as well as a constructors' championship in 1998. Mercedes part-owned McLaren, and the collaboration had been extended into the production of road-going cars such as the Mercedes-Benz SLR McLaren.

In 2007, McLaren-Mercedes was fined a record US$100 million for stealing confidential Ferrari technical data.

In 2009, Ross Brawn's newly conceived Formula One team, Brawn GP used Mercedes engines to win the titles. At the end of the season, Mercedes-Benz sold its 40 percent stake in McLaren to the McLaren Group and bought 70% of the Brawn GP team jointly with an Abu Dhabi-based investment consortium. Brawn GP was renamed Mercedes GP for the 2010 season and became the main team for Mercedes-Benz. The company continued providing engines to other teams under customer relationships.

After major rule changes in 2014, Mercedes clinched the drivers' and constructors' titles with drivers Lewis Hamilton and Nico Rosberg, after dominating much of the season. Mercedes repeated the feat in 2015, winning 16 out of 19 races, and again in 2016, winning 19 of the 21 races. In the following years, Mercedes continued its success by winning the drivers' championships from 2017 to 2020 and the constructors' championships from 2017 to 2021, becoming the first team to win seven consecutive "double-championships". In these years, Hamilton was the champion in 2014, 2015, 2017, 2018, 2019 and 2020, while Rosberg won in 2016. Their unbeaten streak was broken in 2021, when Max Verstappen of Red Bull-Honda won the drivers' championship.

=== Formula E ===
Prior to pre-season testing of the 2019–20 Formula E Championship, it was announced that Mercedes, through its EQ branch, would join the championship with drivers Stoffel Vandoorne and 2019 FIA Formula 2 champion Nyck de Vries. The team named its Spark Gen2 challenger the Mercedes EQ Silver Arrow 01. De Vries clenched the title in 2020-21 season while Vandoorne won the championship in 2021–22 season. After winning both driver and team world championships, Mercedes EQ left Formula E and sold the team to McLaren.

== Logo history ==
In June 1909, Daimler Motoren Gesellschaft (DMG) registered both a three-pointed and a four-pointed star as trademarks, but only the three-pointed star was used. To DMG, the star symbolized Gottlieb Daimler's aims for universal motorisation: on land, water and in the air.

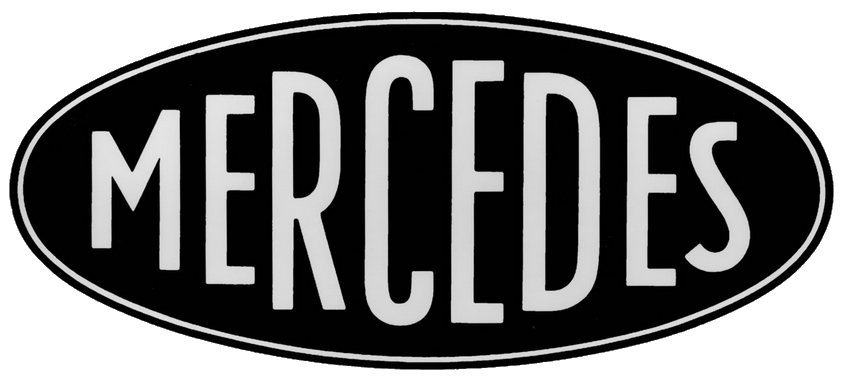
1902–1909 (Note: Logo of the Mercedes automobile brand by Daimler Motoren Gesellschaft.)

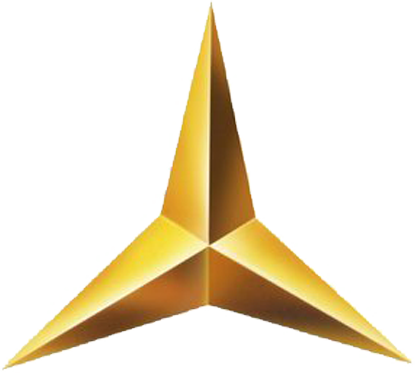
1909–1916

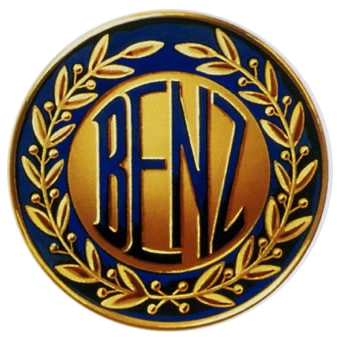
1909–1916

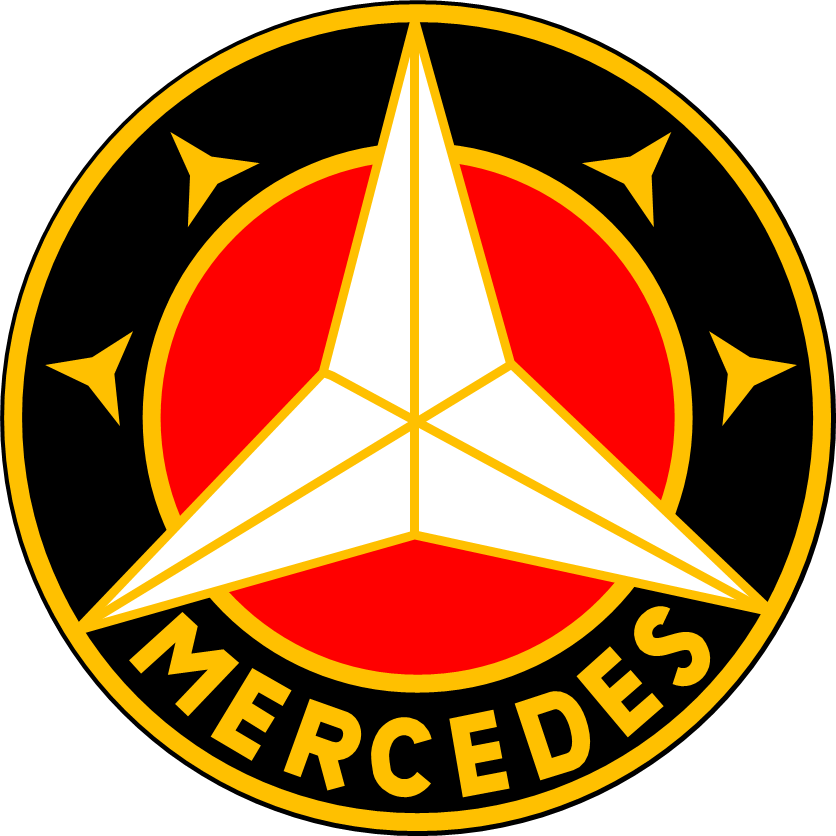
1916–1926

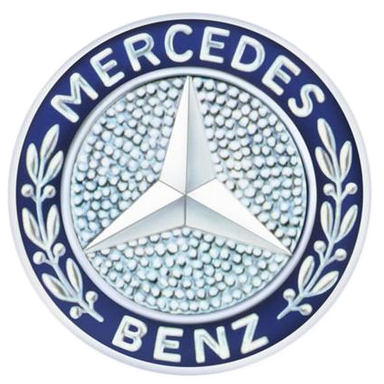
1926–1930 Still Used On Cars

1930–1989

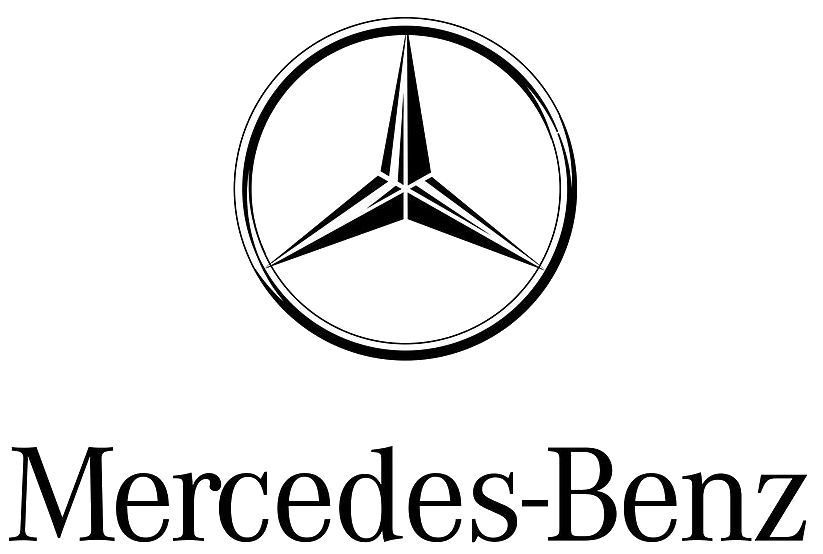
1989–2008

2010–2025 still used on cars

== Noted employees ==
- Paul Bracq – major designer of automobiles in the 20th century
- Adolf Daimler – chief engineer, COO and member of the board of directors 1899–1913. Son of Gottlieb Daimler and developer of the brand logo.
- Béla Barényi – car safety pioneer (rigid passenger safety shell), joined Daimler-Benz in 1937
- Wilhelm Maybach – automotive pioneer, first met Gottlieb Daimler in 1865
- Ferdinand Porsche – founder of Porsche, joined Mercedes in 1923 and developed the Kompressor
- Bruno Sacco – joined Daimler-Benz as a designer in 1958. Head of Design in 1975, retired in 1999
- Rudolf Uhlenhaut – joined Daimler-Benz in 1931, his designs included the Silver Arrows, the 300 SL and 300SLR
- Adolf Eichmann – Nazi leader and war criminal. Worked in Argentina's factory after WWII
- Rudolf Caracciola – one of the greatest GP drivers in history drove MB Silver Arrows in competition.
- Josef Ganz – Technical consultant and "Godfather" of the *Mercedes-Benz W136, with the revolutionary Independent suspension, Swing axle layout.
- Juan Manuel Fangio – Five-time Formula 1 World Champion, honorary president of Mercedes-Benz Argentina from 1987 until his death in 1995.
- Michael Schumacher – Seven-time Formula 1 World Champion, drove for Mercedes in the World Endurance Championship in the 80s and then in its Formula One Team from 2010 till 2012.
- Lewis Hamilton – Seven-time Formula 1 World Champion, drove for Mercedes in its Formula One Team from 2013 to 2024 who holds the all-time record for most pole positions (105) and race victories (106). Despite being a Mercedes driver since 2013, Hamilton has competed using Mercedes engines since 2007 and has been affiliated with Mercedes since he was 13 years old.
- Nico Rosberg – 2016 Formula 1 World Champion, drove for Mercedes in its Formula One Team from 2010 till 2016. Rosberg won all his races and achieved all his pole positions with Mercedes and is currently a brand ambassador for Mercedes.
- Toto Wolff – CEO and Team Principal of the Mercedes-AMG Petronas F1 Team

== Innovations ==
Numerous technological innovations have been introduced on Mercedes-Benz automobiles throughout the many years of their production, including:

- The internal combustion engine automobile was developed independently by Benz and Daimler & Maybach in 1886.
- Daimler invented the honeycomb radiator of the type still used on all water-cooled vehicles today.
- Daimler invented the float carburetor which was used until replaced by fuel injection.
- The "drop chassis" is the car originally designated the "Mercedes" by Daimler; it was also the first car with a modern configuration, having the carriage lowered and set between the front and rear wheels, with a front engine and powered rear wheels. All earlier cars were "horseless carriages", which had high centres of gravity and various engine/drive-train configurations.
- The first passenger road car to have brakes on all four wheels (1924).
- In 1936, the Mercedes-Benz 260 D was the first diesel-powered passenger car.
- Mercedes-Benz were the first to offer direct fuel injection on the Mercedes-Benz 300SL Gullwing.
- The "safety cage" or "safety cell" construction with front and rear crumple zones was first developed by Mercedes-Benz in 1951. This revolutionised the automotive industry with passive safety.
- In 1959, Mercedes-Benz patented a device that prevents drive wheels from spinning by intervening at the engine, transmission, or brakes. In 1987, Mercedes-Benz applied for its patent by introducing a traction control system that worked under both braking and acceleration.
- An anti-lock braking system (ABS) was first offered on the W116 450SEL 6.9. They became standard on the W126 S-Class starting production in 1979 and first sold in most markets in 1980.
- Airbags were first introduced in the European market, beginning with the model year 1981 S-Class.
- Mercedes-Benz was the first to introduce pre-tensioners to seat belts on the 1981 S-Class. In the event of a crash, a pre-tensioner will tighten the belt instantaneously, removing any 'slack' in the belt, which prevents the occupant from jerking forward in a crash.
- In September 2003, Mercedes-Benz introduced the world's first seven-speed automatic transmission called '7G-Tronic'.
- Electronic Stability Programme (ESP), brake assist, and many other types of safety equipment were all developed, tested, and implemented into passenger cars—first—by Mercedes-Benz. Mercedes-Benz has licensed some of its innovations for use by competitors. Crumple zones and ABS were included in 1990s safety legislation in Europe and the US.

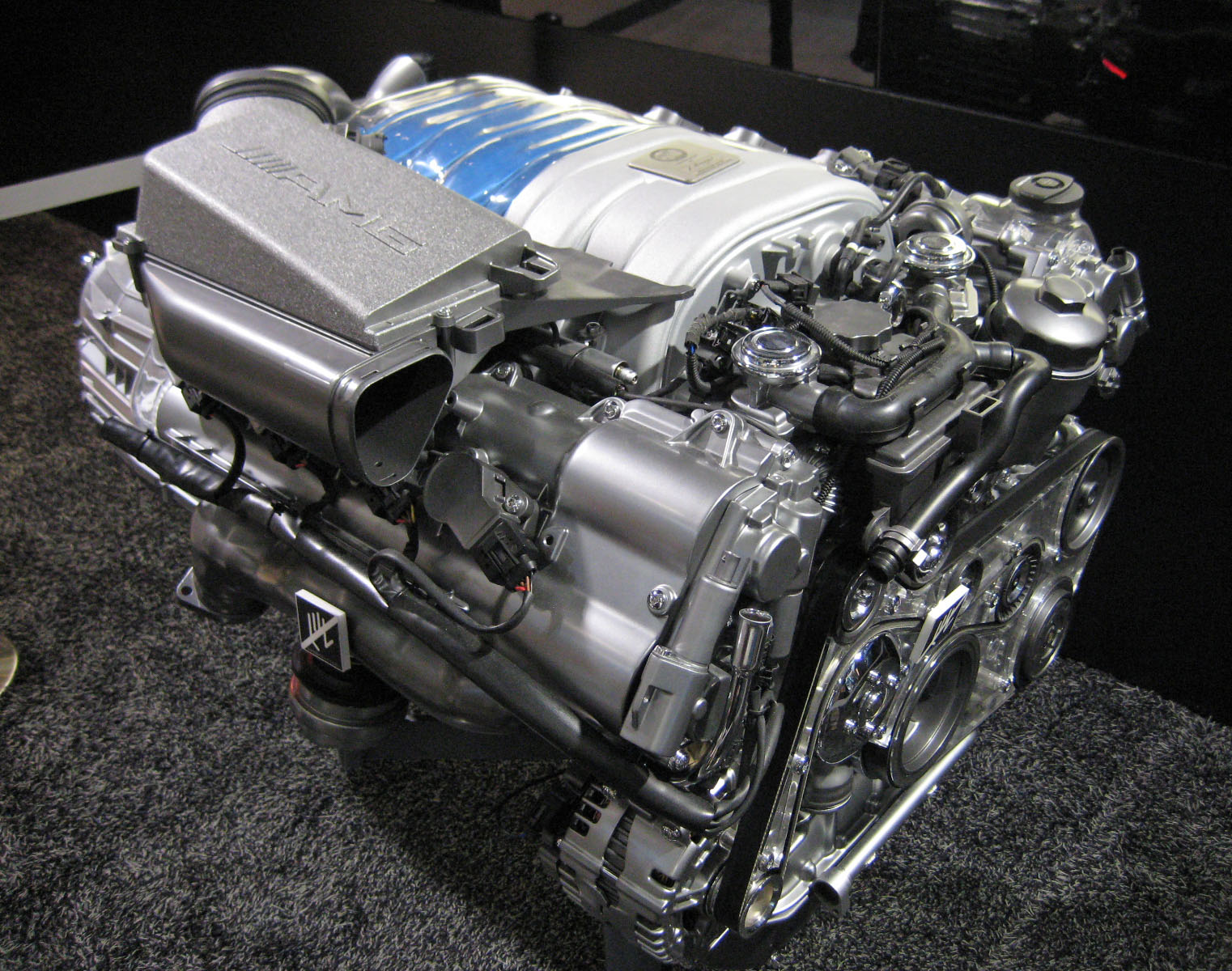
Mercedes M156 engine

- The (W211) E320 CDI which has a variable geometry turbocharger (VGT) 3.0-litre V6 common rail diesel engine (producing 224 hp or 167 kW), set three world endurance records. It covered 100,000 miles (160,000 km) in a record time, with an average speed of 224.823 km/h (139.70 mph). Three identical cars did the endurance run (one set above record) and the other two cars set world records for time taken to cover 100,000 kilometres (62,137 mi) and 50,000 miles (80,000 km) respectively. After all three cars had completed the run, their combined distance was 300,000 miles (480,000 km) (all records were FIA approved).
- Mercedes-Benz pioneered a system called Pre-Safe to detect an imminent crash—and prepares the car's safety systems to respond optimally. It also calculates the optimal braking force required to avoid an accident in emergency situations and makes it immediately available for when the driver depresses the brake pedal. Occupants are also prepared by tightening the seat belt, closing the sunroof and windows, and moving the seats into the optimal position.
- At 181 horsepower per litre, the M133 engine installed in Mercedes-Benz A45 AMG was (as of June 2013) the most powerful series-production four-cylinder turbocharged motor, and has one of the highest power densities of a passenger vehicle.
- Mercedes-Benz won the Safety Award at the 2007 What Car? Awards.
- Mercedes-Benz updated its conditionally automated driving system DRIVE PILOT, and has received the approval by the German Federal Motor Transport Authority. This will allow the DRIVE PILOT to be used in flowing traffic up to 95km/h under certain conditions, on the entire 13,191km-long German Autobahn network.

=== Robot cars ===
In the 1980s, Mercedes built the world's first robot car, together with the team of Professor Ernst Dickmanns at the University of the Bundeswehr Munich. Encouraged in part by Dickmanns' success, in 1987 the European Union's EUREKA programme initiated the Prometheus Project on autonomous vehicles, funded to the tune of nearly €800 million. In 1995 Dickmanns' re-engineered autonomous S-Class Mercedes took a long trip from Munich in Bavaria to Copenhagen in Denmark, and back. On highways, the robot achieved speeds exceeding 175 km/h (109 mph) (permissible in some areas of the German Autobahn).

In October 2015, the company introduced the Vision Tokyo, a five-seat self-driving electric van powered by a hybrid hydrogen fuel-cell system. The super-sleek van is touted as "a chill-out zone in the midst of megacity traffic mayhem."

== Tuners ==
Several companies, including Brabus, Renntech and Carlsson, have become car tuners (or modifiers) of Mercedes Benz models, to increase performance and/or luxury of a given model. AMG is Mercedes-Benz's in-house performance-tuning division, specialising in high-performance versions of most Mercedes-Benz cars. AMG engines are all hand-built, and each completed engine receives a tag with the signature of the engineer who built it. AMG has been wholly owned by Mercedes-Benz since 1999. The 2009 SLS AMG, a revival of the 300SL Gullwing, is the first car to be entirely developed by AMG.

== Sponsorships ==
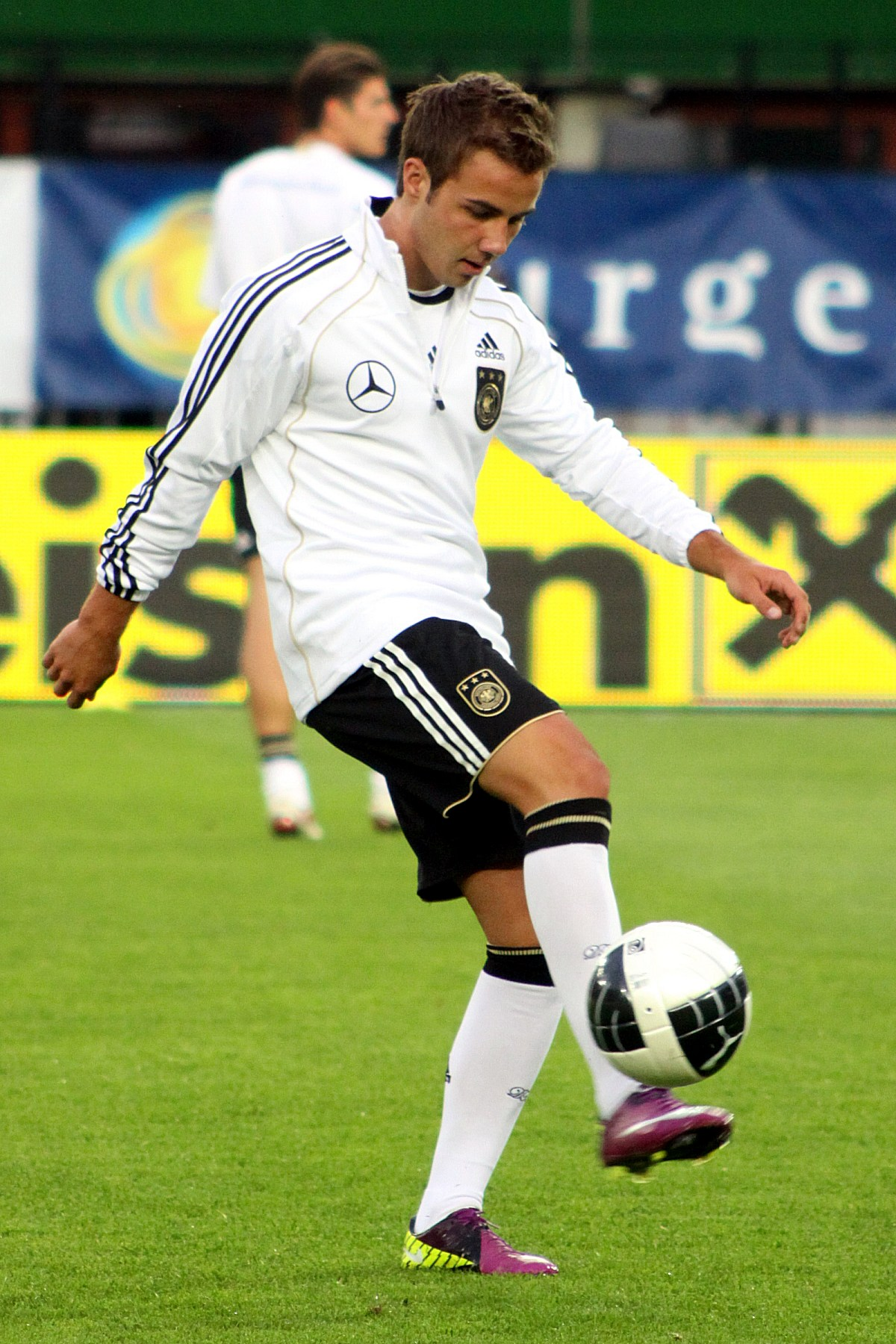
Mercedes-Benz sponsors the Germany national football team.

In football (soccer), Mercedes-Benz sponsored the Germany national team until 2018. Mercedes-Benz sponsors Bundesliga club VfB Stuttgart and provided until June 2023 the naming rights for its stadium, the former Mercedes-Benz Arena. The company formerly held a ten-year naming rights contract to the Caesars Superdome, an American football stadium in New Orleans, from 2011 to 2021. On 24 August 2015, Mercedes-Benz was announced as the naming rights sponsor for the Atlanta Falcons' new home, Mercedes-Benz Stadium, (Mercedes-Benz's US headquarters are in Greater Atlanta) which opened in August 2017.

Mercedes-Benz worked with English magician Steven Frayne, also known as Dynamo, to create a video called Dynamo vs Coulthard. Formula One driver David Coulthard drove Dynamo around a track at race-speed in a Mercedes-Benz SL63 AMG, before Dynamo successfully drove around the same track in the same car whilst blindfolded and surrounded by pyrotechnics. The stunt was part of the finale for Series 3 of Dynamo: Magician Impossible, screened on UK television channel Watch.

To promote the release of Mario Kart 8, Nintendo and Mercedes-Benz partnered up to have three of its cars in its history, the 2014 Mercedes-Benz GLA, the 1957 SL 300 Roadster, and the 1934 W25 Silver Arrow as karts in the game. As part of the partnership, Mario, Luigi, and Peach appeared in Japanese commercials to promote the 2014 Mercedes-Benz GLA.

The Mercedes-Benz was chosen by Mitsubishi Electric as an official sponsor of AFF Mitsubishi Electric Cup 2022, along with Maspion Holdings, Wuling, Gree, Yanmar and Tiger Brokers.

== See also ==
- Bertha Benz
- Diesel emissions scandal
- Mercedes-AMG
