= Daimler =

Daimler is a German surname. It may refer to:

== People ==
- Gottlieb Daimler (1834–1900), German inventor, industrialist and namesake of a series of automobile companies
- Adolf Daimler (1871–1913), engineer and son of Gottlieb Daimler
- Paul Daimler (1869–1945), engineer and son of Gottlieb Daimler

== Places ==
- Mount Daimler, a peak in Antarctica named after Gottlieb Daimler

== Companies ==
=== Germany ===
- Daimler AG, the past name of the Mercedes-Benz Group (2007 to 2022), known to the public as Mercedes-Benz, formerly known as Daimler-Benz AG (1926–1998) and DaimlerChrysler AG (1998–2007)
  - Daimler Mobility, banking and credit/debit card services subsidiary renamed as Mercedes-Benz Mobility in 2022.
- Daimler Truck, demerged in 2021
  - Daimler Buses, formerly EvoBus
  - Daimler Truck North America, formerly Freightliner Corporation, Portland, Oregon
  - Daimler India Commercial Vehicles, a subsidiary based in Chennai, India
  - Daimler Buses North America, subsidiary in Greensboro, North Carolina, US
- Daimler Motoren Gesellschaft (DMG), original maker of the Mercedes brand (1890–1926); merged with Benz & Cie. in 1926

=== Austria ===
- Austro-Daimler, an Austrian subsidiary (1899–1909) independent after 1909
- Steyr-Daimler-Puch, a group including Austro-Daimler after it was sold to Steyr-Werke AG (1934–2001)

=== France ===
- Panhard-Daimler

=== United Kingdom ===
- Daimler Company, a manufacturer of cars, trucks and buses in Coventry, England (1896–1960)
  - Daimler Airway, an airline subsidiary (1921–1924)
  - Daimler Hire, a limousine service subsidiary (1919–1976)

=== United States ===
- Daimler Manufacturing Company, an attempted American manufacturer of cars under license from Daimler (1888–1907) in New York City
- DaimlerChrysler Motors Company; an era of the company Chrysler, one of the Big 3 automotive companies of North America, now part of Stellantis

== Vehicles ==
- Gottlieb Daimler vehicles:
  - Daimler Motorized Carriage, the first automobile produced by Gottlieb Daimler and Wilhelm Maybach in 1892
  - Daimler Stahlradwagen, the second automobile made by Gottlieb Daimler in 1892
  - Daimler Reitwagen, a two-wheeled vehicle produced by Gottlieb Daimler in 1885 and widely recognized as the first motorcycle
- Daimler Company vehicles:
  - List of Daimler cars
  - Daimler Armoured Car, a British armored vehicle of World War II
  - Daimler Dingo, a British light reconnaissance vehicle of World War II
  - Daimler Roadliner
  - Daimler Fleetline
  - Daimler Freeline
