= Daim =

Daim or DAIM may refer to:

== People ==
- Azimi Daim (born 1964), Malaysian politician
- DAIM (born 1971 as Mirko Reisser), German graffiti artist
- Daim Zainuddin (1938–2024), former Finance Minister of Malaysia
- Olivier le Daim (born Olivier de Neckere; ca. 1428–1484), close advisor of Louis XI of France
- Wilfried Daim (1923–2016), Austrian psychologist, psychotherapist, writer and art collector

== Places ==
- Daim, Iran or Deym (Persian: ديم), a village in Iran
- Daim, a village in the municipality of Arnreit, Upper Austria

== Other uses ==
- Daim bar, a Swedish chocolate bar

== See also ==
- Daimler (disambiguation)
