= Adolf Daimler =

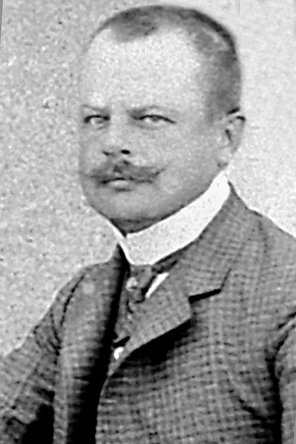
1907

Adolf Daimler (8 September 1871 – 24 March 1913) was the son of German inventor and industrialist Gottlieb Daimler. A mechanical engineer by training, Adolf became managing director and co-owner of his father's firm Daimler-Motoren-Gesellschaft in 1900. Along with his brother Paul Daimler, Adolf is credited with developing the distinctive Mercedes 3-pointed star logo.

== Biography ==
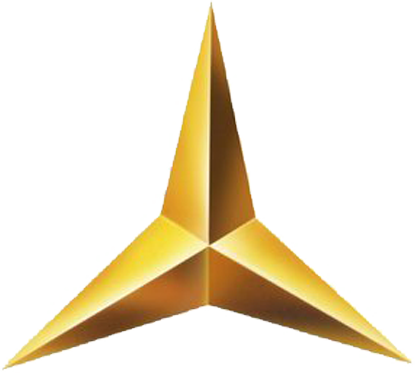
Mercedes marque (1909) developed by Adolf Daimler

Adolf Daimler was born on September 8, 1871, in Karlsruhe, then the capital of the Grand Duchy of Baden. He was the second son of Gottlieb Daimler and spent his childhood in Cologne when his father served as technical director at the Deutz AG gas engine factory. In 1882, the family moved to Bad Cannstatt, one of the outer city districts of Stuttgart, then the capital of the Kingdom of Württemberg. Adolf attended the nearby Royal Institute of Stuttgart (German: Königliche Realanstalt zu Stuttgart), where he graduated in 1891. After an apprenticeship at the Maschinenfabrik Esslingen company, he studied mechanical engineering at the University of Stuttgart from 1895 to 1898. During this time he married Marie Schuler.

In 1899 Adolf joined his father's company, Daimler-Motoren-Gesellschaft (DMG), which had been founded in 1890. There he helped develop the Mercedes brand. He and his brother Paul Daimler adapted a three-pointed star to represent the company and trademarked it in 1900. Their father had once used such a symbol to mark the family's house on a postcard depicting a view of the town of Deutz. Adolf became chief engineer in 1900 and deputy board member in 1904. In 1907, he was appointed chief operating officer and appointed to the board of directors. After a long illness, Adolf died on March 24, 1913, in the university town of Tübingen. His funeral was held on March 26, 1913, at Uff Cemetery in Bad Cannstatt, where his father had already been laid to rest a few years earlier. His funeral was attended by a number of industrialist dignitaries, including Robert Bosch.

== Honors ==
- Royal Order of Frederick I of Württemberg Knight's Cross 1st Class
- Order of the Red Eagle 4th class
