= Paul Daimler =

German automotive engineer

Paul Daimler (13 September 1869 – 15 December 1945) was a German mechanical engineer who designed automobiles. He was the eldest child of Gottlieb Daimler who founded Daimler-Motoren-Gesellschaft and (with Wilhelm Maybach) invented the petrol engine.

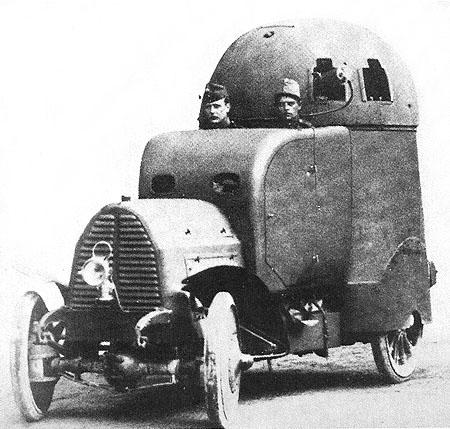
The Austro-Daimler armoured car

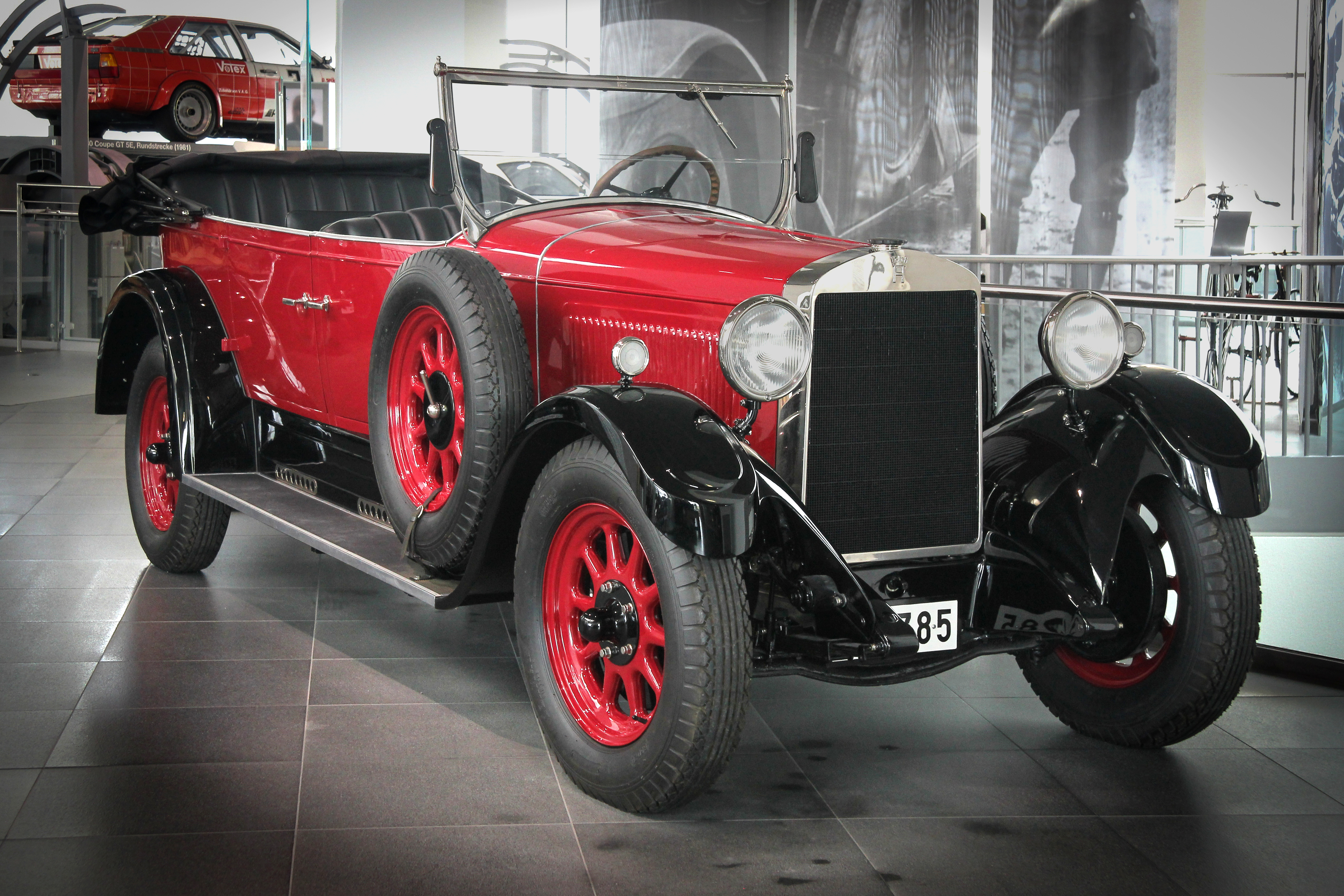
Horch 8 Type 303 (1927) in museum mobile

After studying at the Technische Hochschule Stuttgart, he worked in his father's factory in Cannstatt. On 10 November 1885 he travelled with his father in the "riding car"—the world's first motorcycle—from Cannstatt to Untertürkheim. In 1902, Paul was sent to the general partners of Austro-Daimler, where he became the technical director. In 1903, he designed an armoured car. His successor at Austro-Daimler was Ferdinand Porsche.

From 1907 to 1922 he was Technical Director of Daimler-Motoren-Gesellschaft with factories in Untertürkheim, Sindelfingen and Berlin-Marienfelde. Under Hyperinflation in the Weimar Republic, the Daimler company soon merged with Benz to form Daimler-Benz, but over 50 year old Paul Daimler was not part of the merger. His successor was once again Ferdinand Porsche.

Instead, on 1 July 1923, he joined Horch, part of Argus Motoren Gesellschaft, and made a name for himself there as a developer of the 8-cylinder Horch 8 car that successfully challenged Mercedes-Benz, and in the department of motor aircraft engines, remaining until 1928.

Examples of his work include the hydraulic valve lifters, which he introduced to German automobile production in 1931. During the Great Depression in Germany Horch merged into Auto Union, and Daimler retired.

== Publications ==
- Daimler, Paul (December 1901). "The Development Of The Petroleum Automobile". Engineering Magazine. XXII (3): 350.
