= Thor (motorcycles) =

American motorcycle company

Thor Moto cycle and Bicycle Company
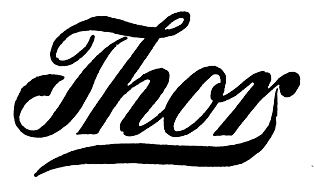
- Thor motorcycle logo
- Type: LLC
- Founded: 1901
- Founder: Aurora Automatic Machinery Company
- Fate: Sales stopped in 1920
- Headquarters: Aurora, Illinois, USA
- Products: Motorcycles

Thor was an American manufacturer of motorcycles and motorcycle parts especially engines, founded in 1901 in Aurora, Illinois. From 1901 to about 1907 it made engines under license for Indian Motocycles (note spelling) of Springfield, Massachusetts, which Thor was also allowed to sell on the open market. Thor also sold a large variety of parts especially cylinder heads, and when the agreement finally ended, entered the motorcycle market on its own selling complete bikes until about 1920. Some of its success were supplying engines to many motorcycle manufactures of the period, some record setting bikes in the early 1910s, and V-Twin engine with automatic valves.

Although Thor motorcycles ceased production, it continued as a brand of household appliances by the parent Aurora Automatic Machinery Company which survived. Aurora Automatic Machinery Company had previously made cast metal parts in the late 1800s.

== Summary ==
Thor made engines for Indian from 1901 to 1907 when they introduced their own cycle; before then they only made engines and parts for other makers. In 1910 Thor introduced a V-Twin engine, and mounted one cylinder straight up unlike in the more V shape that became common later in the century. By 1913 they had developed a more advanced larger displacement engine and it was mounted with both cylinders at angles, in the typical V-shape.

Thor stopped making motorcycle engines in 1916, and production dwindled in the late 1910s.

== History ==
Thor was the motorcycle marque of Aurora Automatic Machinery Company, which produced motorcycle engines for Indian motorcycles and went on to produce its own line of motorized bicycles in the early 1900s. Aurora holds a special place in transportation history, employing Oscar Hedstrom, Al Crocker, and Bill Ottoway, famous for Indian motorcycles, Crocker Motorcycles, and Harley-Davidson respectively at one time or another. Aurora started in 1886 as a machine shop and is known for making parts for bicycles in its early period.

In 1901 Oscar Hedstrom worked with Aurora to make engines for Indian motorcycles, and by 1902 they had made 150 motors for Indian. As part of their agreement Aurora was allowed to sell the motors to other parties and pay Indian a royalty. Aurora also continued to make other bike parts but not a complete bike. Finally Indian started producing their own parts and Aurora then went on to produce their own complete motorcycle known as Thor motorcycles. The agreement between the two companies expired in 1907. Before that time, Thor did not make complete bikes and Indian used the Thor manufactured engines of Hedstrom's design. After the split Thor began to innovate new features and this included the F-head engine, a V-twin engine, and automatic (aka mechanical) valves on the engine.

In 1908 Thor achieved automatic intake valves on their engine and offered many typical options for the day. During this time there was options like battery ignition and belt drive. In 1913 Thor offered a Schebler carburetor on its 1200 cc twin. Thor also used updraft carburetors on their engines. In 1916 they offered a 3-speed transmission on their cycle. Another option was an acetylene lamps for light.

A Thor motorcycle was used in the 1913 Charlie Chaplin film (18 minutes long) Mabel at the Wheel.

Thor stopped making motorcycle engines in 1916, and production dwindled in the late 1910s. In the early 1910s sales began to decline, and one of the factors may have been the rise of the Ford Model T.

An example of a Thor product was the Model 13U, which had an overall blue color scheme with white tires and a 7-horsepower twin cylinder internal combustion engine. One of the four surviving Thor Model 13U is at the National Motorcycle Museum in Iowa, USA.

== Racing ==
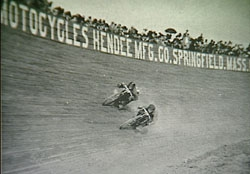
Two people on motorized bicycles race on a board track in 1911.

Thor hired William Ottaway in 1909, and he led Thor to success in motorcycle racing during his tenure until he left the company in 1913. Ottaway was noted for his ability to tune engines and Thor set national records with Thor bikes. At this time much of the racing was on dirt tracks or tracks of wooden boards, and racing was noted as important for of recognition on the motorcycle market. (see also Board track racing)

An example of a Thor racing bike was the 1912 Thor Board Track Racer, which shipped in a special Thor box. They were called board track racers because in this day, the racing courses were made of planks of wood to make the race track, hence a 'board track'. The wooden tracks were called motordromes and were quite dangerous to drivers and the crowds. Most of the sport's stars died racing and its popularity had diminished by the 1920s according to the Smithsonian Institution.

== Engines ==
Thor supplied engines to many manufacturers including:

- Sears (Sears Roebuck sold via mail-order motorcycles from 1913 to 1916)
- Chicago
- Reading Standard
- Indian (Hendee co)
- Torpedo motorcycles

Thor also made parts and castings for Flying Merkel, Reading Standard, Henderson Motorcycle, and Harley-Davidson.

- Henderson sold motor bikes from 1912 to the end of 1931.
- Flying Merkel sold motor bikes from 1911 to 1915.
- Sears sold from 1913 to 1916.

== Models ==
Here is some examples of models offered:

- Model 13-M (4 hp single)
- Model 13-W (5 hp single)
- Model 13-U (7 hp twin)
- A two-speed was offered as an option on each of the motorcycles for an extra fee.

Additional examples:

- Thor Model 7
- Thor Model 14A
- Thor Model O (had a V-twin with mechanical inlet valves)
- Thor Model U (this had a re-designed V-twin)
- Thor Model V
- Thor Model M
- Thor Model W (came with a 5 hp single cylinder engine in 1911)

Aurora also supplied Sears for a short time before they switched to a different company in the early 1910s. (see also Sears Dreadnought)

== 1916 Model Thor ==
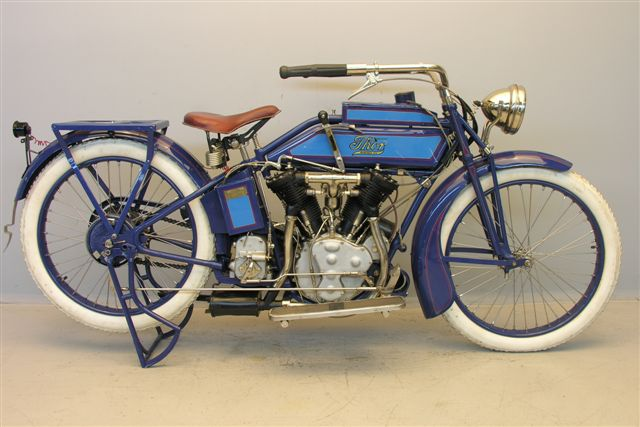

== 1911 Model Thor ==
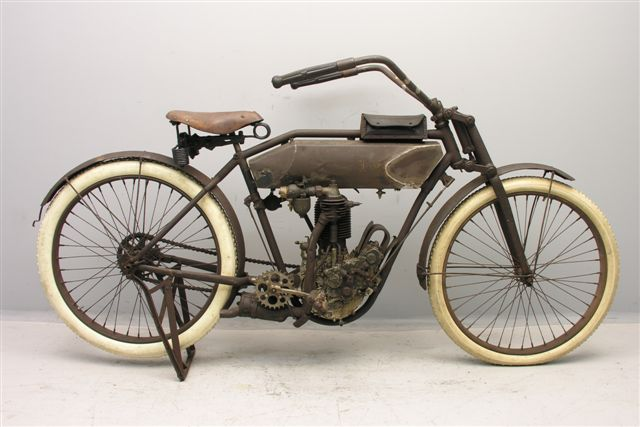

== 1909 Model Thor ==
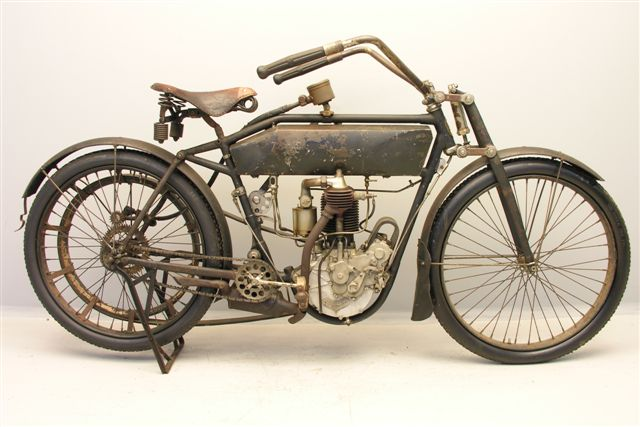

== In museums ==
- Allen County Museum, 1912 Thor model. This particular item won honors at the 2014 Amelia Island Concours d'Elegance.
- Thor Model 13U at the National Motorcycle Museum in Iowa, USA.
- 1903 Thor Camelback at the Petersen Automotive Museum in Los Angeles, California.
- 1913 Thor at Seal Cove Auto Museum

== See also ==
- List of motorcycle manufacturers
- List of motorcycles of the 1910s

== ThorMX ==
Apparel Motocross
