= List of motorcycles of the 1910s =

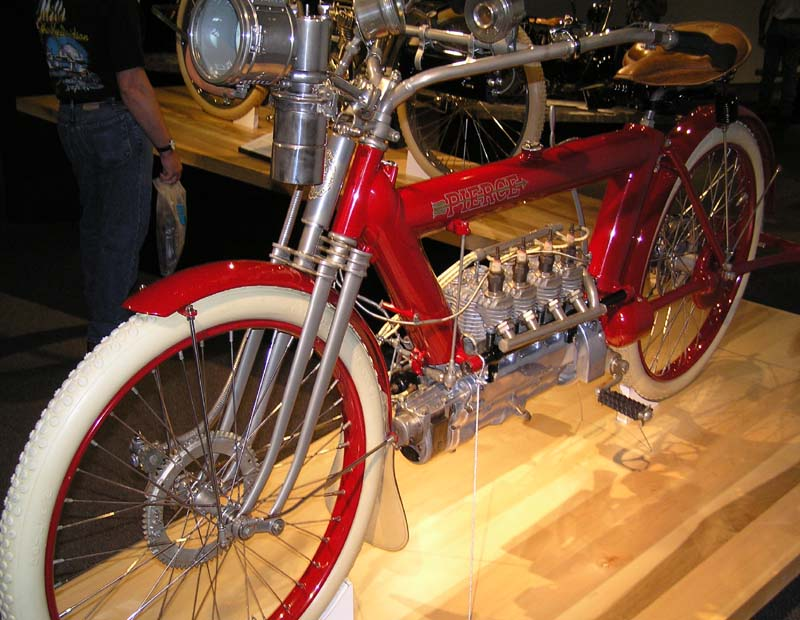
Pierce Four, sold from 1909 to 1913 when the company went out of business

List of motorcycles of the 1910s is a listing of motorcycles of the 1910s, including those on sale, introduced, or otherwise relevant in this period.

The 1910s has their share of expensive historic motorcycles sold at auction, especially the brands Cyclone and Flying Merkel. A 1915 Cyclone Board Track Racer went for US$852,500 at an auction in 2015, one of the just 12 that survived; another of this model sold for $551,200 in 2008. A 1911 Flying Merkel Board Track Racer went for $423,500 in 2015 and a 1911 Flying Merkel for $201,250 in 2011. A 1911 Harley-Davidson 7D went for $283,400 in 2014. The $850k for the Cyclone Board Track was the highest price yet known to be paid publicly for a motorcycle auction (of any decade).

== Examples ==
- Acme
- Acme (by EMY Ready)
- Adria (motorcycle)
- AJS Model D
- ANA
- Autoped
- Bat No. 2 Light Roadster
- Blackburne motorcycles
- Bi-Autogo
- Cleveland motorcycle
- Cyclone motorcycles
- Cyclone Board Track Racer (1915 V-Twin).
- Detroit Single motorcycle
- Flying Merkel Model 471
- Flying Merkel Board Track Racer
- Flying Merkel Model 50
- Flying Merkel Model 70
- FN Four (various version produced, 1905–1923)
- Harley-Davidson Model 7D
- Harley-Davidson Model J
- Harley-Davidson Model 10F
- Harley-Davidson Model W
- Harley-Davidson 8A
- Harley-Davidson X8A (1912)
- Harley-Davidson 11F
- Hazlewoods models 1911 to 1924
- Hazlewoods with 3.5 hp JAP engine
- Hazlewoods Colonial
- Henderson Motorcycle models
- Henderson Model A (1912)
- Henderson Model B (1913)
- Henderson Model C (1914)
- Henderson Model F (1916)
- Henderson Model G (1917)
- Henderson Model H (1918)
- Henderson Model Z (1919)
- Henderson Four Generator
- Husqvarna Moto-Reve model 1910
- Indian Model O
- Indian Powerplus
- Indian Scout (Came out in October 1919 (1920 model year))
- Iver Johnson motorcycle
- Marsh Metz motorcycle
- Minneapolis Model S-2 Deluxe Twin
- Militaire Four aka Militaire Model 2
- Norton 16H
- Peugeot 500 M
- Pierce Four, sold from 1909 to 1913
- NSU Motorenwerke, NSU 350 TT, Heeresmodel
- Pierce Single
- Pope Model L
- Pope Model K
- Pope Model 8L
- Rover (motorcycles) models including 248 cc, 348 cc, and 676 cc JAP V-twin.
- Rover TT 500CC (1913)
- Rover 3 1/2 h.p. (1911)
- Rover Imperial 500 cc (1916)
- Royal Pioneer
- Sears Dreadnought
- Thor Model U
- Triumph Model H
- Wanderer, Models 2 pk (250 cc), 4 pk (504 cc)
- Wilkinson TMC
- Williamson Flat Twin
- Winchester 6 HP

=== Gallery ===
Examples

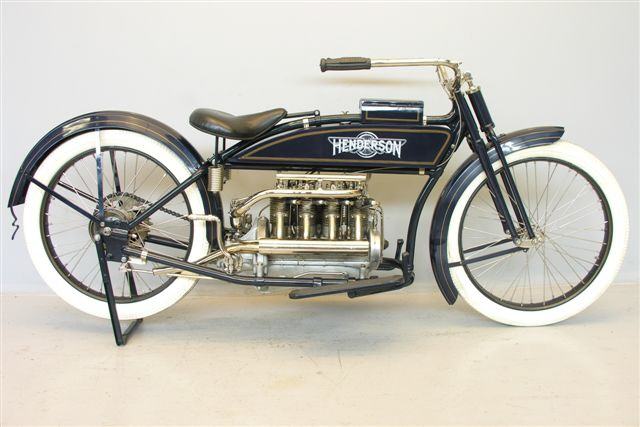
Henderson Model F of 1916

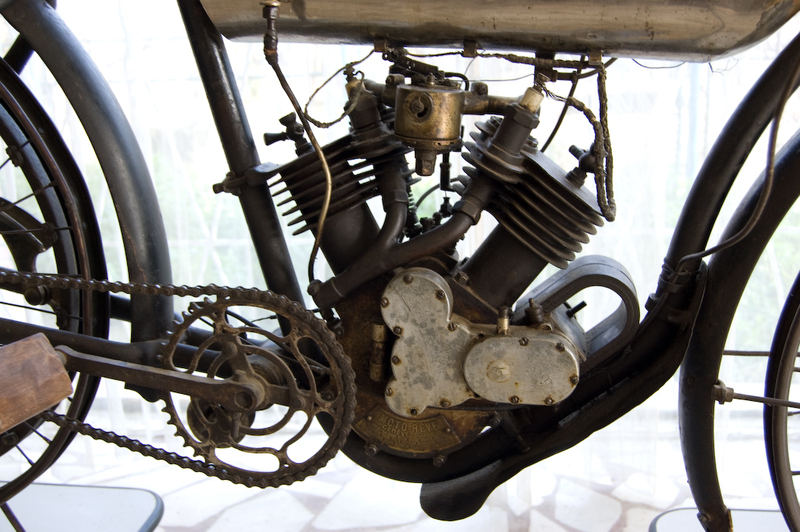
View of a 1910 Husqvarna Moto-Reve

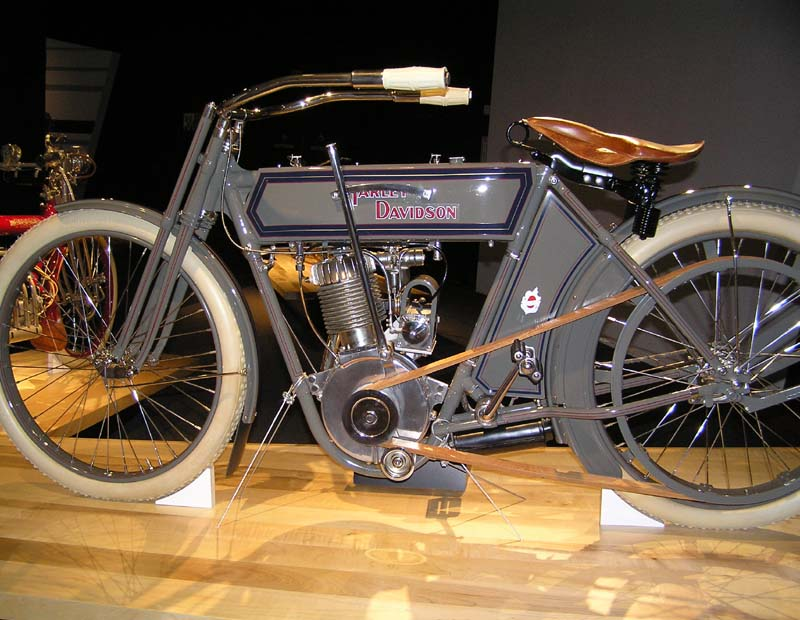
1911 VN Harley-Davidson Model 7D

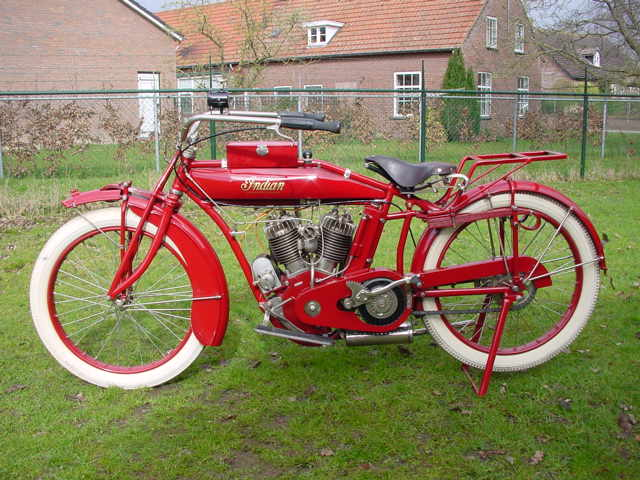
1916 Indian Powerplus

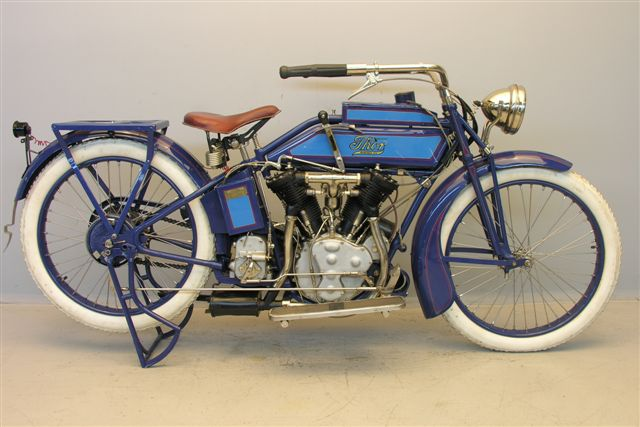
1916 Thor Model

== Manufacturers and marques ==
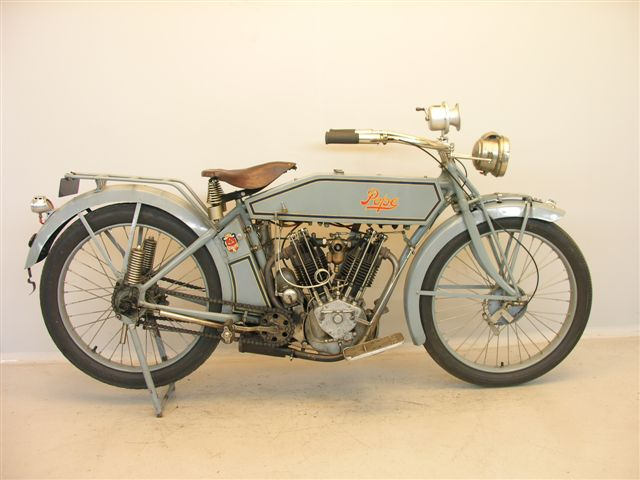
Pope Model L

Some companies had a brand for their motorcycles

- Hendee Manufacturing Company
  - Indian
- Aurora Automatic Machinery Company
  - Thor
- Joerns Motor Manufacturing Company
  - Cyclone
- Consolidated Manufacturing (of Toledo, Ohio)
  - Yale
- Light Manufacturing and Foundry Company
  - Light Merkel
- Miami Cycle and Manufacturing Company of Middletown, Ohio
  - Flying Merkel
- Pope Manufacturing Company,
  - Pope

== Trike ==
- Minneapolis Model N Tricar

== See also ==
- Cyclecars
- Ford Model T
- List of motorcycle manufacturers
- List of motorcycles of the 1890s
- List of motorcycles of 1900 to 1909
- List of motorcycles of the 1920s
- List of motorcycles of the 1930s
- List of motorcycles of the 1940s
- List of motorcycles by type of engine
- List of motorized trikes
- Safety bicycle
