= Bat Motor Manufacturing Co. =

British motorcycle manufacturer

Bat Motor Manufacturing Co. Ltd
- Type: Private
- Industry: Motorcycle
- Founded: 1902
- Founder: Leow0ok
- Defunct: 1926
- Fate: Ceased motorcycle production
- Headquarters: Penge, England, United Kingdom
- Key people: Samuel Robert Batson
- Products: Motorcycles

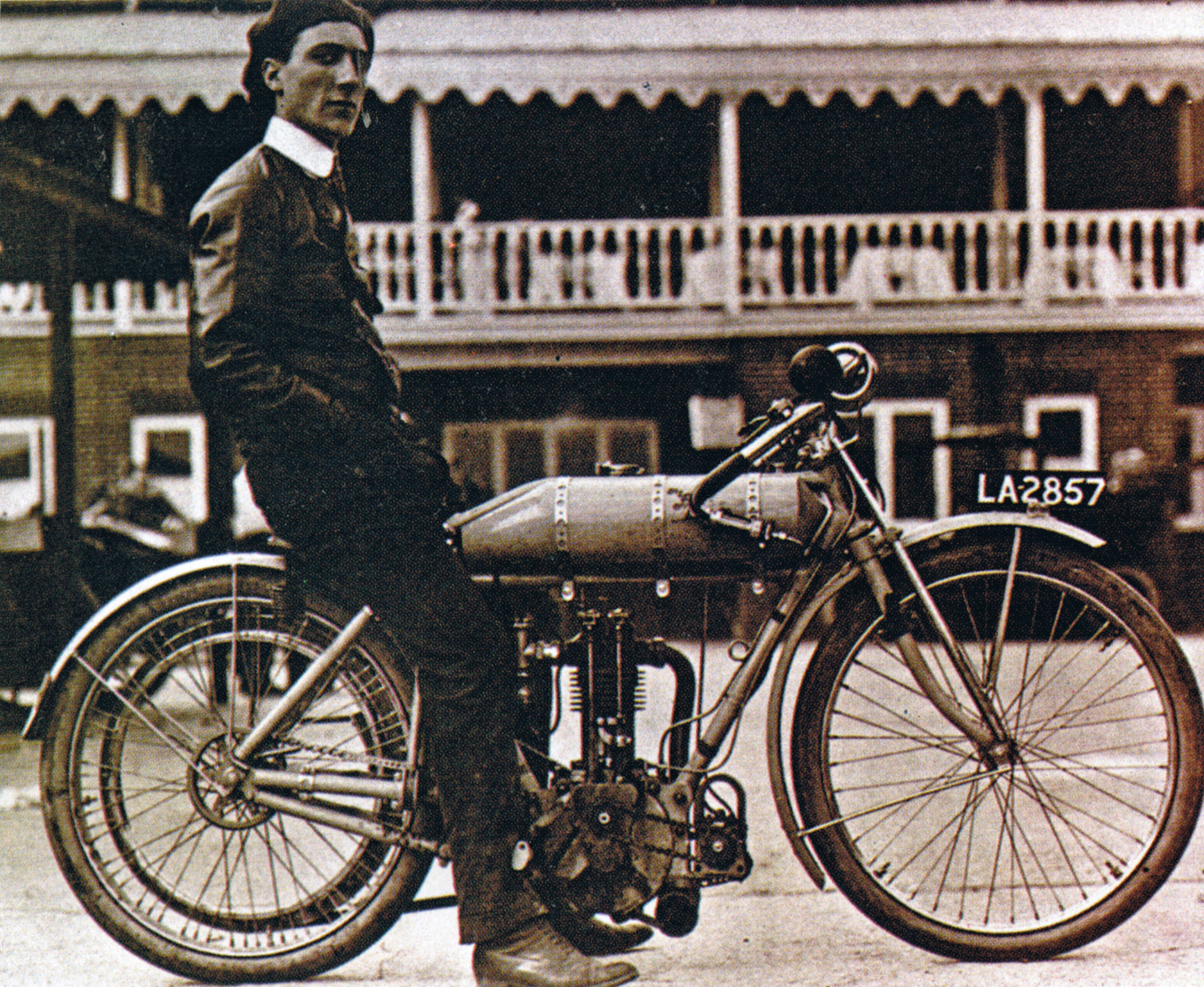
BAT single-cylinder motorcycle

The Bat Motor Manufacturing Co. Ltd was a British motorcycle manufacturer that operated between 1902 and 1926. Significant innovations developed by the company included one of the first motorcycle suspension systems, with a leading link front fork and a subframe suspended on springs from the main frame.

== History ==
Founded in 1902, the Bat Motor Manufacturing Co. Ltd was named after founder Samuel Robert Batson. Based in Penge, the first Bat motorcycle used a small 2.5 hp (1.9 kW) de Dion engine but poor sales led to Batson selling the company to Theodore Tessier in 1904. Nicknamed 'Best After Tests,' two Bat motorcycles were entered in the 1907 Isle of Man TT races. The company produced the first sprung frame in 1906 and in 1908 developed one of the first sidecar outfits, with two powered wheels on a removable sidecar. Tessier was also an innovator and keen to develop motorcycling technology. Significant innovations included one of the first practical clutch mechanisms and he also patented one of the first motorcycle full suspension systems, with a leading link front fork and a subframe suspended on springs from the main frame. To raise awareness of the motorcycles, Tessier began serious competitive racing and achieved over 200 wins, setting numerous speed records. Bat also developed twin-cylinder motorcycles in 1912 and managed seventh place in the 1913 Senior TT. Production ended with the outbreak of the First World War but restarted in 1919. They took over Martinsyde Motorcycles in 1923 but financial difficulties led to the closure of the Bat-Martinsyde company in 1926.

== Car production ==
Bat also produced a number of tricars, with a wicker passenger seat over the front axle. The single-cylinder engines were usually 3 hp (2.2 kW) or 6 hp (4.5 kW). By 1904 a number of cars were produced using a 6 hp 2-cylinder Fafnir engine and a seat for the driver instead of the usual saddle, with a semi-enclosed wooden body for a passenger. In 1909 Bat introduced the Carcycle, which was similar to a motorcycle and sidecar but had four wheels and handlebar steering.

== See also ==
- Bat No. 2 Light Roadster
- List of motorcycles of the 1910s
- List of motorized trikes
