= Stressed member engine =

Automotive chassis type

A stressed member engine is a vehicle engine used as an active structural element of the chassis to transmit forces and torques, rather than being passively contained by the chassis with anti-vibration mounts. Automotive engineers use the method for weight reduction and mass centralization in vehicles. Applications are found in several vehicles where mass reduction is critical for performance reasons, usually after several iterations of conventional frame/chassis designs have been employed.

== Applications ==
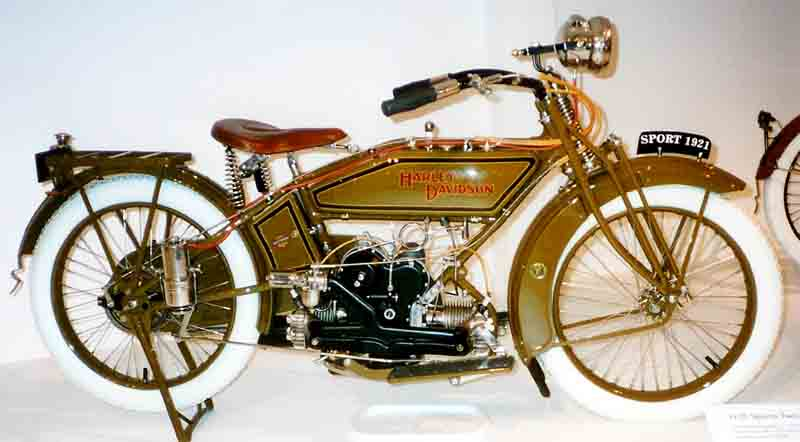
Harley-Davidson Model W with structural tubes bolted directly to engine case to complete the frame triangle

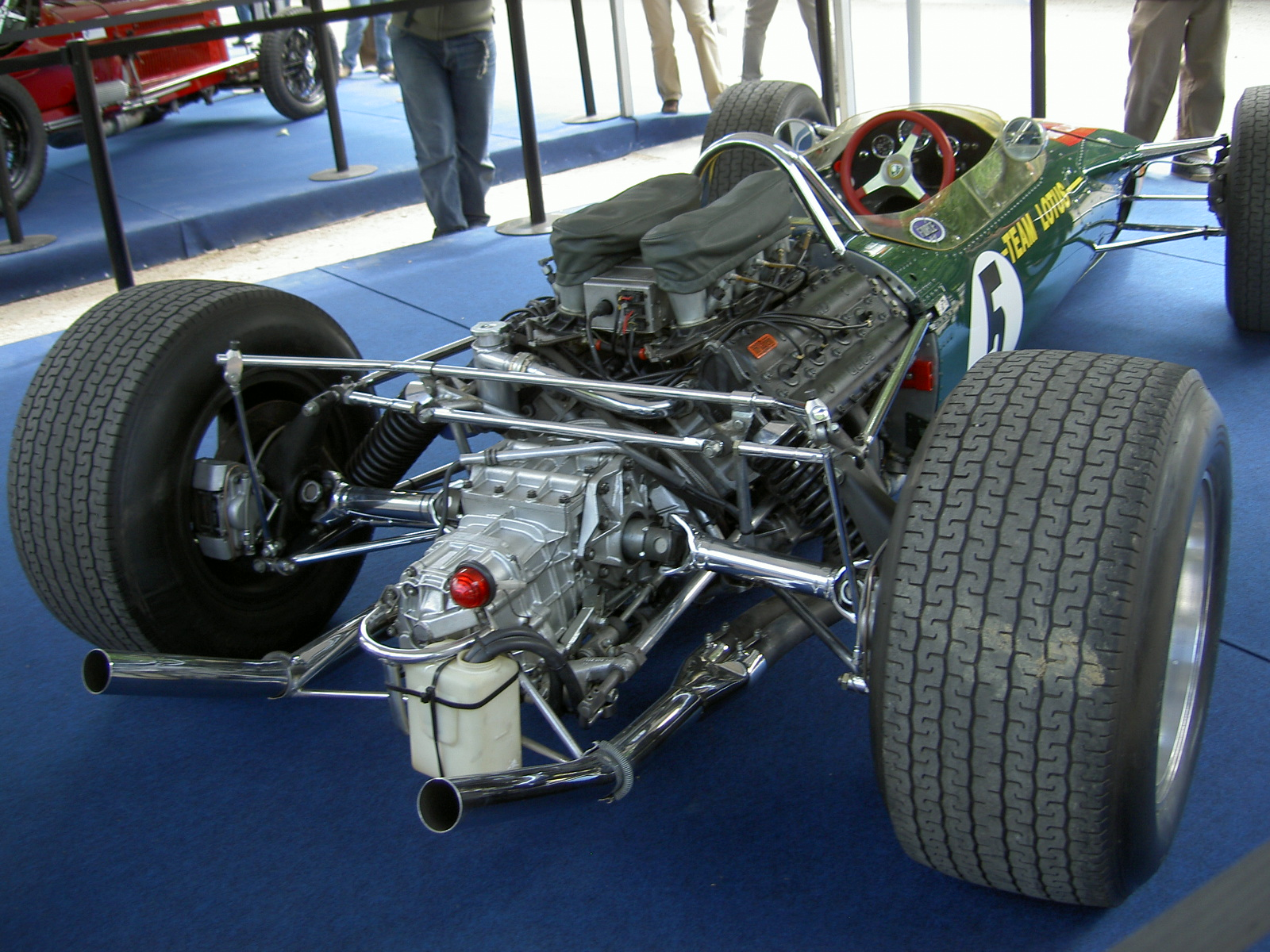
The Lotus 49 suspension is bolted directly to the drivetrain

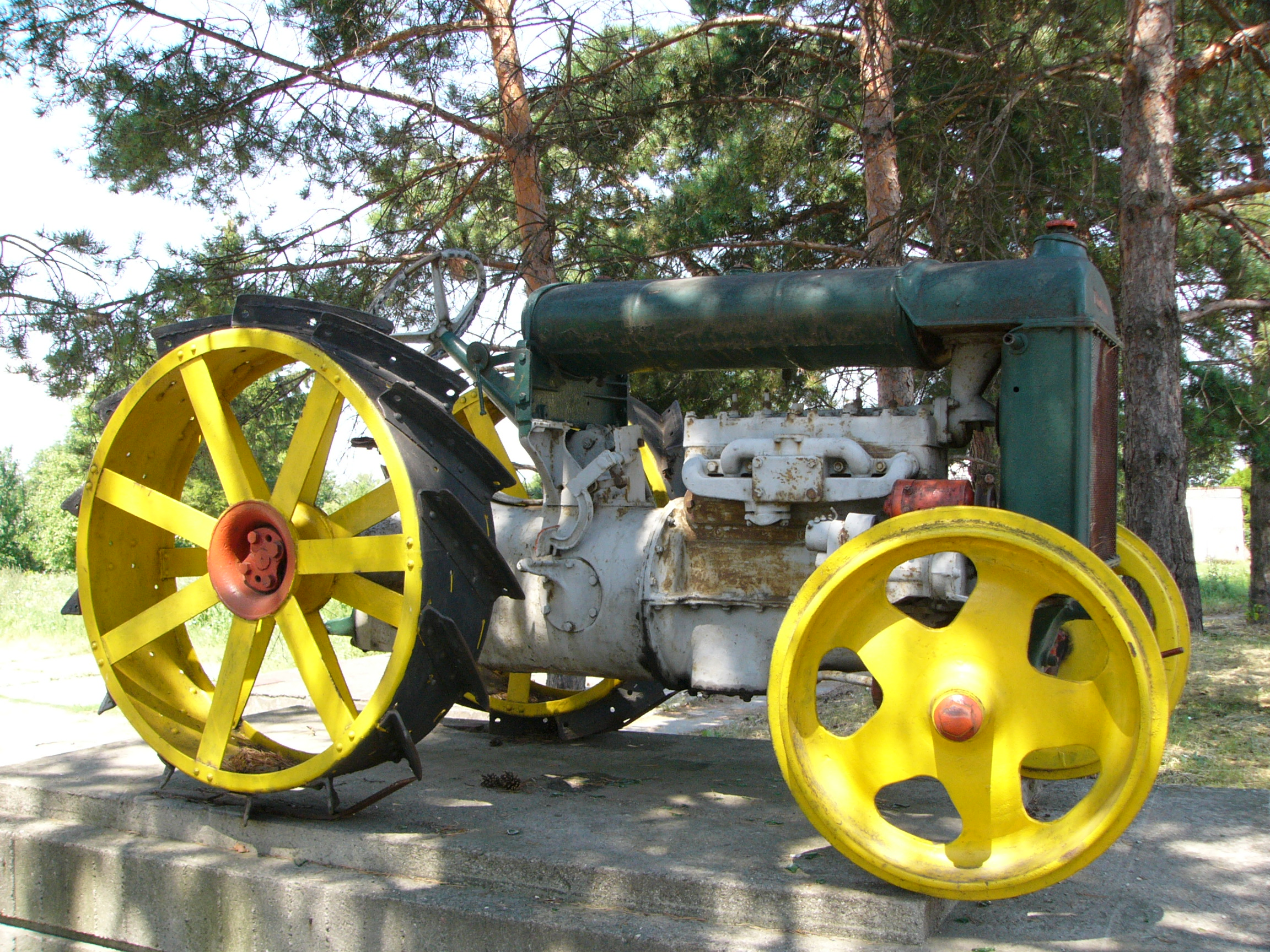
A frameless Fordson Model F tractor

=== Motorcycles ===
Stressed member engines was patented in 1900 by Joah ("John") Carver Phelon and his nephew Harry Rayner. and were pioneered at least as early as the 1916 Harley-Davidson 8-valve racer, and incorporated in the production Harley-Davidson Model W by 1919. The technique was developed in the 20th century by Vincent and others, and by the end of the century was common feature of chassis built by Ducati, BMW and others. In 2019, KTM Duke 790's engine is used as a stressed member.

=== Automobiles ===
Many mid-engine sport cars have used stressed engine design.

==== Race cars ====
The 1967 Lotus 49 is credited for establishing a solution copied by "everyone" in Formula One. This requirement is cited as a reason the rules committee changed from an inline-four to a V-6 configuration for the 2014 Formula One season.

==== Production automobiles ====
The limited-production De Tomaso Vallelunga mid-engine car prototyped in 1963 used the engine as a stressed member.

The Ferrari F50 was famously noted for having its engine act as a stressed member similar to Formula 1 cars of the era.

In GM's Chevrolet Bolt and Tesla Motors Model S and Roadster electric cars, the battery pack is a stressed member to increase rigidity.

=== Tractors ===
The Fordson tractor Model F, designed during World War I, eliminated the frame to reduce cost of materials and assembly, and was probably influenced by the similar design of the 1913 Wallis Cub.
