= Flat-twin engine =

Piston engine with two cylinders in opposing directions

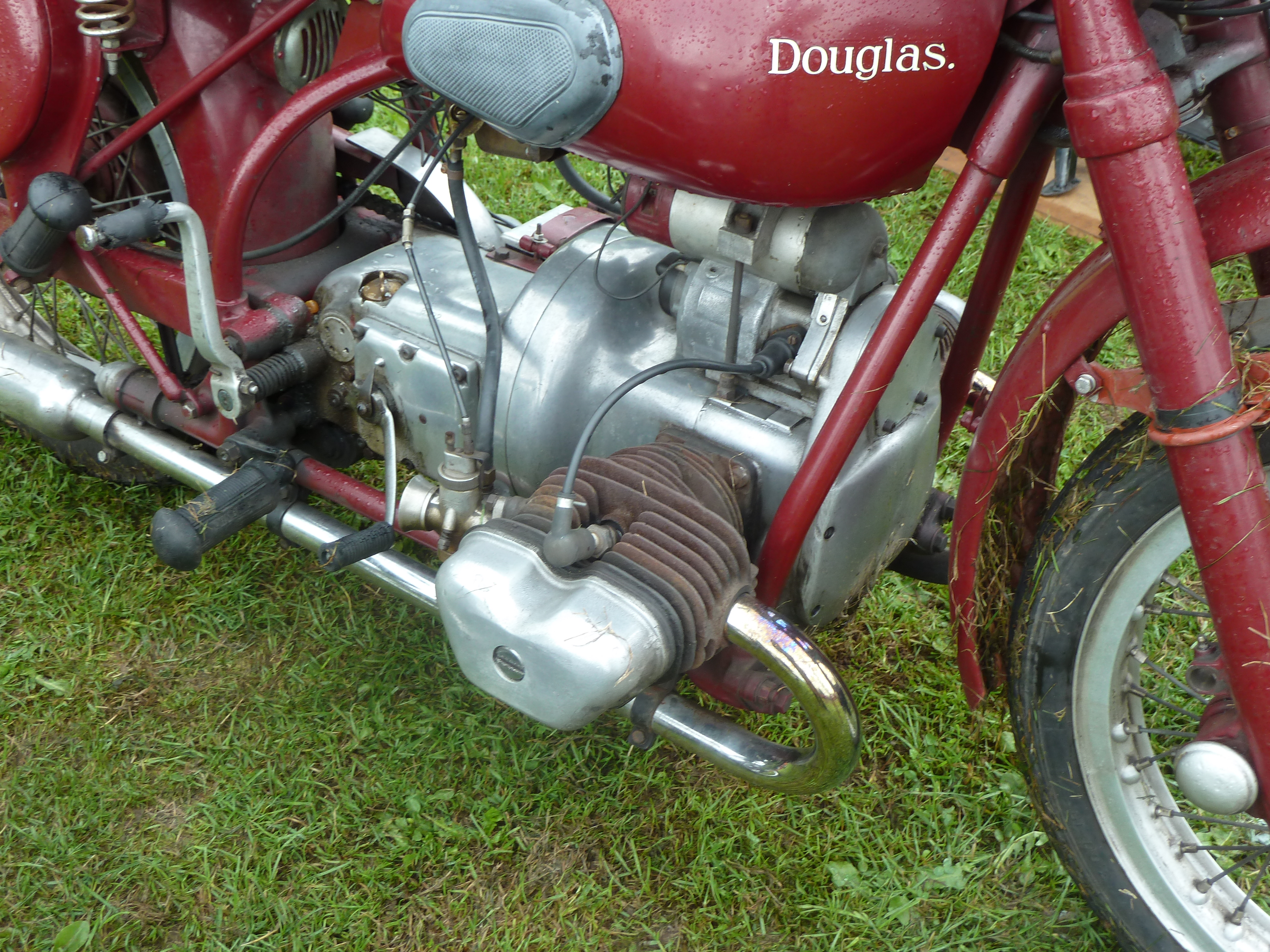
Douglas 80 Plus motorcycle engine (circa 1950)

A flat-twin engine is a two-cylinder internal combustion engine with the cylinders on opposite sides of the crankshaft. The most common type of flat-twin engine is the boxer-twin engine, where both pistons move inwards and outwards at the same time.

The flat-twin design was patented by Karl Benz in 1896 and the first production flat-twin engine was used in the Lanchester 8 hp Phaeton car released in 1900. The flat-twin engine was used in several other cars since, however a more common usage is in motorcycles; early models oriented the cylinders in line with the frame, however later models switched to the cylinders being perpendicular to the frame to provide even cooling across both cylinders.

Flat-twin engines were also used in several aircraft up until the 1930s and in various stationary applications from the 1930s to the 1960s.

The Australian lawnmower manufacturer Victa also produced a flat-twin engine push mower from August 1975 to 1980 dubbed the ‘Twin 500’, and later the ‘Supreme’. These engines were manufactured in Canada. They are very sought after as only small numbers were produced, most likely due to ignition- and fuel-related problems in early models. In the Supreme (the later model) all these problems were fixed with a rear-domed piston, crankcase mixers and refined ignition system.

== Typical design ==
Boxer crankshaft configuration (The illustration contains errors regarding the right piston; the geometry of a flat-twin engine is symmetrical.)

Most flat-twin engines use a boxer configuration for the crankshaft and are therefore called "boxer-twin" engines. In a boxer-twin engine, the 180° crankshaft moves the pistons in phase with each other, therefore the forces generated by one piston are cancelled out by the other, resulting in excellent primary balance. The evenly spaced firing order also assists in reducing vibration. The equal and opposite forces in a boxer-twin engine do however generate a rocking couple, due to the offset distance between the pistons along the crankshaft.

Wasted spark ignition system

A commonly used ignition system is wasted spark, which is a simple ignition system using a double-ended coil firing both spark plugs on each revolution (i.e. during both the compression and exhaust strokes). This system is distributorless and requires only a single contact breaker and coil for the engine.

=== Crankcase pressure ===
The boxer-twin configuration can cause pressuring of the crankcase during each inward piston stroke and de-pressurisation during each outward piston stroke, since both pistons are moving inwards or outwards at the same time. This crankcase pumping effect (also found on single-cylinder engines and 360° parallel-twin engines) is usually addressed by means of a crankcase breather.

The Citroën 2CV boxer-twin engine took advantage of this pumping effect to maintain a partial vacuum inside the crankcase, in order to reduce oil leaks when an oil seal malfunctions. This was achieved by using a one-way valve (a leather or rubber flap over a hole in the crankcase), to let air escape the crankcase but not enter it.

== Applications ==
=== Automobiles ===
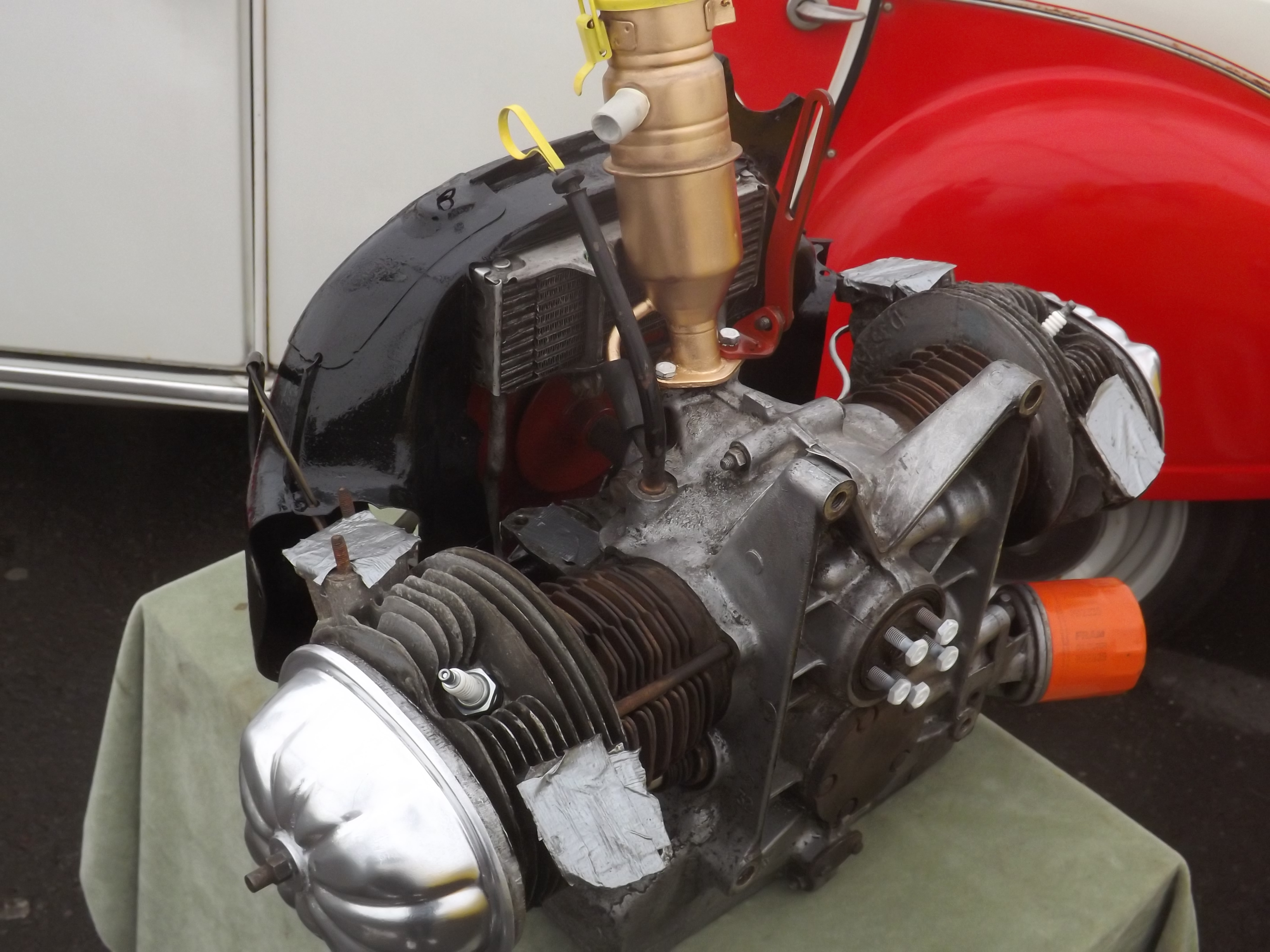
Citroën 2CV engine (viewed from rear)

The beginnings of the flat-twin engine were in 1896, when Karl Benz obtained a patent for the design. A year later, his company Benz & Cie unveiled the first flat-twin engine, a boxer design called the "contra engine".

In 1900, The Lanchester Engine Company began production of the Lanchester 8 hp Phaeton, which used a flat-twin engine. This engine had an unusual design of two counter-rotating crankshafts, with each piston attached to its crankshaft by a thick connecting rod. Each piston was also connected to the other crankshaft by two thinner connecting rods, causing the two pistons to move on the same axis. It also had the torque reaction of one crankshaft cancel the torque reaction of the other, cancelling torque reaction in the engine. Lanchester used this engine design until 1904.

Other early uses of flat-twin engines were 1903-04 Ford Model A, the 1904-1905 Ford Model C, the 1905-1906 Ford Model F. and several Jowett Cars models from 1910 to 1937.

The Citroën 2CV, produced from 1948 to 1990, was one of the first front-wheel drive cars to use a flat engine. The 2CV was powered by an air-cooled boxer-twin engine. Also in 1948, the Panhard Dyna X was released with front-wheel drive and an air-cooled boxer-twin engine. Other cars following World War II using boxer-twin engines were the 1945-1954 Jowett Bradford van,, the 1961-1976 DAF Daffodil, the 1961-1978 Toyota Publica, the 1965-1969 Toyota Sports 800 sportscar and several front-wheel drive models from Citroën and Panhard. Several rear-engined cars were also produced with boxer-twin engines originally designed for motorcycles, such as the 1957-1975 Puch 500, the 1957-1959 BMW 600 and the 1959-1965 BMW 700. The Brazilian manufacturer Gurgel Motores used an in-house developed water-cooled boxer-twin engine (Enertron engine) and the Volkswagen air-cooled boxer-four in several models from 1988 to 1994.

The Toyota U engine was an air-cooled flat-twin engine produced from 1961 to 1976. Introduced in the Toyota Publica subcompact car, the U engine was also used in the Toyota MiniAce small commercial vehicle and the Toyota Sports 800 sports car.

=== Motorcycles ===
==== Transverse mounting ====
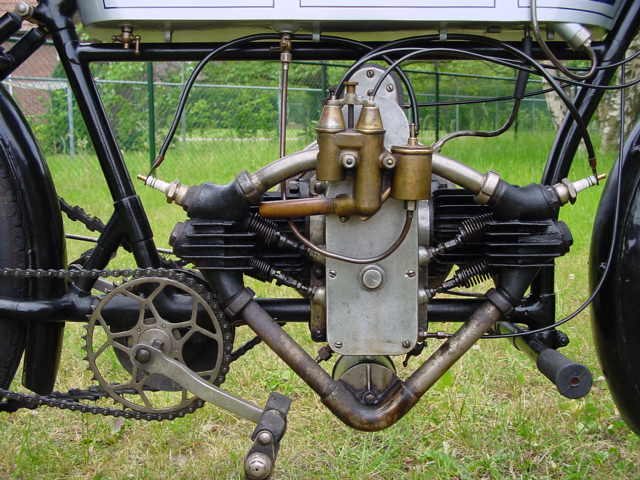
1912 Douglas N3 engine

The benefits of using a flat-twin engine mounted with the crankshaft running perpendicular to the frame (therefore the cylinders being in line with the frame) are a low centre of gravity and that a belt-drive or chain-drive system can be used to transmit drive to the rear wheel. However, the downsides are uneven heat distribution (the front cylinder is more heavily cooled than the rear cylinder) and a longer wheelbase is often required due to the length of the engine.

The first flat-twin motorcycle engine was built in 1905 by the Light Motors Company in the United Kingdom. Originally named the Fée (renamed "Fairy" soon after its introduction), it was designed as a "bicycle engine system" which transmitted power to a pulley on the rear wheel via a chain. Manufacture of the Fairy was taken over by the Douglas Engineering Company, one of Light Motors' suppliers, when the Light Motors Company folded in 1907. Later in 1907, Douglas changed the drivetrain from the chain and pulley design to a belt-drive system driven directly from the engine. Later developments of the Douglas motorcycle were made with the cylinders in line with the frame until the Second World War.

Other early flat-twin motorcycles used a similar layout, with their cylinders aligned along the frame and therefore with the crankshaft running transverse to the frame.

In 1914 the main supplier of rear-hub gearboxes, Sturmey-Archer, introduced a 3-speed countershaft gearbox with integral kick-starter, which posed a design problem for motorcycles with transversely-mounted flat-twin engines. This gearbox could be relatively easily located behind a single-cylinder or V-twin engine, however this arrangement would result in an excessively long wheelbase for flat-twin engines. Solutions to this problem included using a countershaft below the engine (as used by the Douglas Fairy), or a gearbox located above the engine, although in some cases the cylinders were short enough to use the gearbox in the traditional location behind the engine.

In 1916, most flat-twin motorcycles still used a transversely-mounted engine. The European models at this time included the Bradbury 3.5 hp (2.6 kW), the Brough HB, the Douglas 2.75 hp (2.05 kW) and 4 hp (3.0 kW) models, the Humber 3.5 hp and 6 hp (4.5 kW) models, the Matchless 6 hp, the Montgomery 6 hp, Williamson Flat Twin 8 hp (6.0 kW), and the Bayerische Flugzeugwerke Helios (the predecessor to BMW's first motorcycle). Models produced in the United States included the Indian Model O and the Harley-Davidson Model W.

==== Longitudinal mounting ====
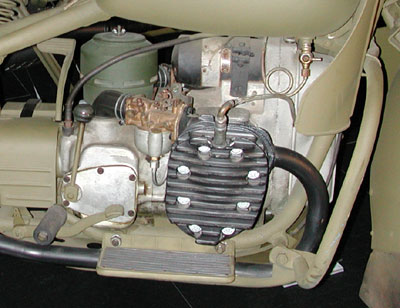
1942 Harley-Davidson XA engine

1967 BMW R 60/2 engine

The main benefit of mounting a flat-twin engine with the crankshaft in line with the frame (therefore the cylinders sitting sideways in the frame) is that an air-cooled engine receives the same amount of cooling for each cylinder. The Harley-Davidson XA, which used a flat-twin engine with the cylinders across the frame, maintained an oil temperature 100 °F (56 °C) cooler than a Harley-Davidson WLA with a V-twin with the cylinders in line with the frame. A side benefit is that the cylinders provide protection to the rider in the event of a collision or fall, and keeps their feet warm in cold weather. The downsides are that the engine cannot be mounted as close to the ground (otherwise the cylinders can scrape the ground during cornering) and that it exposes the cylinders and valve covers to the danger of collision damage.

A longitudinal mounting also means that the torque reaction will twist the motorcycle to one side (such as on sharp acceleration/deceleration or when opening the throttle in neutral) instead of shifting the weight balance between the front and rear wheels. However, many modern motorcycles reduce this effect by rotating flywheels or alternators in the opposite direction to that of the crankshaft.

One of the first motorcycles with a longitudinally-mounted flat-twin engine was the 1916 ABC, which was built in the United Kingdom. To accommodate chain drive, the ABC used a bevel drive at the gearbox to change the direction of the drive through ninety degrees. BMW's first motorcycle, the 1923 BMW R 32 was another early example of a longitudinally-mounted flat-twin engine, although it this case the power was transmitted to the rear wheel via a shaft drive.

Over time, longitudinal mounting became more common for flat-twin engines. BMW has a long history of flat-twin engine motorcycles, as do Ural (Russia) and Dnepr (Ukraine).

=== Aviation ===
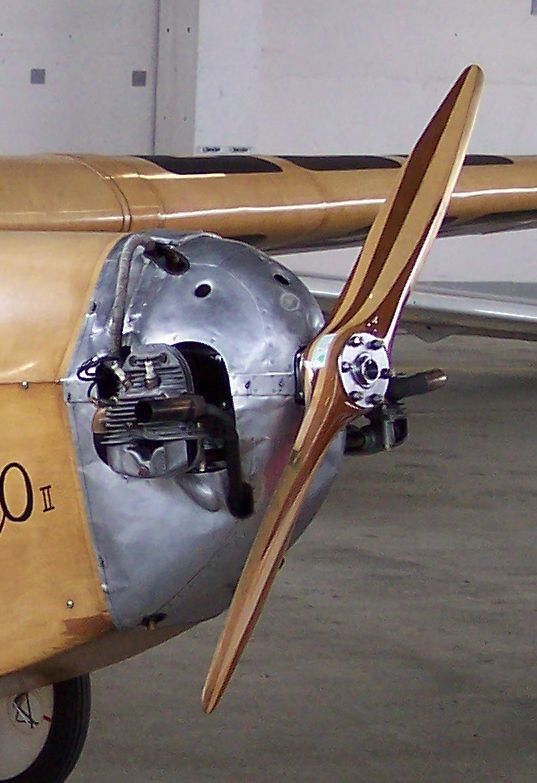
Bristol Cherub II installed in aircraft

In 1902, the Pearse monoplane (which would later become one of the first aircraft to achieve flight) was powered by a flat-twin engine built on a farm by a hobbyist inventor. This engine used the unusual design of a single shared crank pin and double acting pistons. In 1908, the French company Dutheil-Chalmers began production of flat-twin aircraft engines, which used two counter-rotating crankshafts. The Dutheil-Chlamers engine was used by the 1907 Santos-Dumont Demoiselle No. 20 experimental airplane, with later versions of this airplane being produced with flat-twin engines from Darracq and Clément-Bayard.

Most piston-engined aircraft used more than two cylinders, however other flat-twin aircraft engines from the 1920s and 1930s include the American Aeronca E-107 and Aeronca E-113, the British Bristol Cherub, and the Czechoslovak Praga B2. The HKS 700E is an oil-cooled flat twin for ultralight aircraft that is currently in production.

In larger aircraft, flat-twin engines have been used in auxiliary power units (APUs). A notable example was made by ABC Motors in the 1920s and 1930s. During World War II, the Riedel firm in Germany designed and manufactured a two-stroke flat-twin engine as jet engine starter motors for the Junkers Jumo 004, BMW 003 and Heinkel HeS 011 jet engines

=== Other uses ===
The Maytag 'Model 72' flat-twin engines— produced from 1937 until some time between 1952 and 1960— were used in various applications including clothes washing machines.

Electrical generators using flat-twin engines were built by Norman Engineering Company from 1932 to 1968 and by Douglas during World War II. Enfield Industrial Engines (part of Royal Enfield) produced flat-twin two-stroke petrol engines during World War II which were used for generators and other military uses. After 1945, Enfield produced flat-twin diesel engines, with applications including farm and marine use. Coventry Victor introduced a diesel version of its existing 688 cc petrol flat-twin in 1932, and went on to produce flat-twin diesel and petrol engines for a variety of industrial and marine uses into the 1950s.

Two-stroke flat-twins were often used as outboard motors for boats, as they were smoother than single-cylinder engines. In the 1940s, they were largely replaced by straight-twin two-stroke engines, which were easier to start and no longer had excessive amounts of vibration.
