= Cleo Francis Pineau =

American pilot

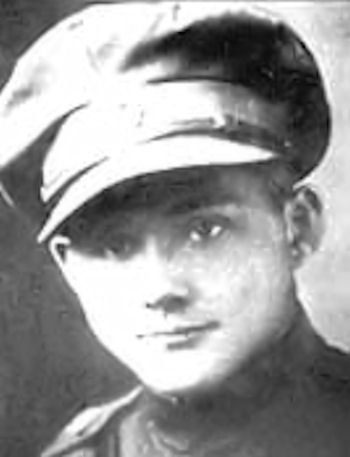
- Cleo Francis Pineau, 1918
- Born: 23 July 1893; Albuquerque, New Mexico, USA
- Died: 29 May 1972 (aged 78); Williamsport, Pennsylvania, USA
- Burial place: Williamsport, Pennsylvania, USA
- Military career
- Allegiance: United States
- Branch: Royal Air Force (United Kingdom)
- Service years: 1917–1918
- Rank: Lieutenant
- Unit: Royal Air Force: No. 210 Squadron RAF
- Conflicts: World War I
- Awards: British Distinguished Flying Cross
- Other work: Sparked civil aviation in Pennsylvania; became executive in steel industry

Lieutenant Cleo Francis Pineau (23 July 1893—29 May 1972) was an American World War I flying ace credited with six aerial victories. He was a renowned motorcycle racer both before and after the war. He later became an executive in the steel industry.

== Early life ==
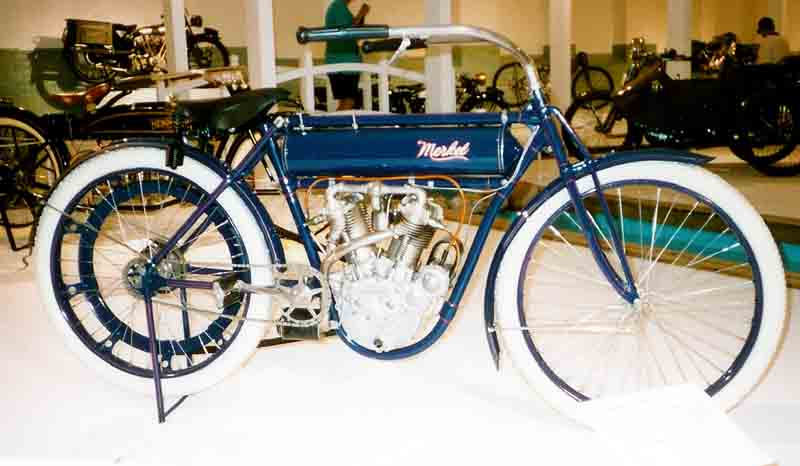
A 1911 Flying Merkel V-Twin.

Pineau was the son of Thomas L. and Adele Gstalder Pineau. He was a restless youth, and dropped out of school in sixth grade. He was a motorcycle racer before World War I. He raced Flying Merkel and Indian Motorcycles, once defeating Barney Oldfield. He also rode in the "Globe of Death" motordrome as a vaudeville performer. During 1914 and 1915, he rode as a professional for the Flying Merkel team.

== World War I ==
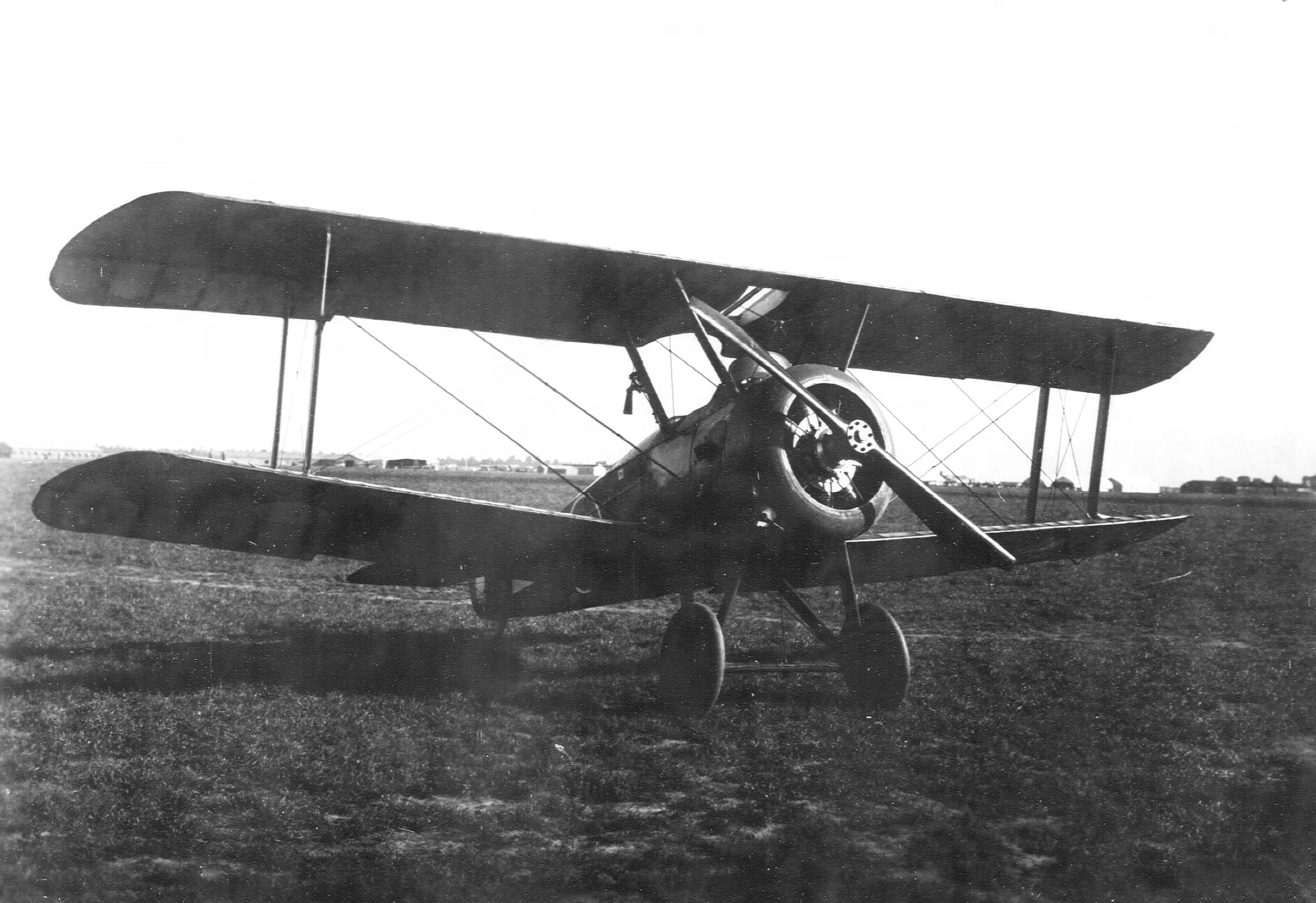
Pineau achieved his victories with a Sopwith Camel.

He joined the Royal Flying Corps in December 1917, and trained at the Curtis Aviation School in Buffalo, New York. He was assigned to No. 210 Squadron RAF on 2 June 1918. Between 6 September and 8 October 1918, he used a Sopwith Camel to destroy four Fokker D.VIIs and drive down two others. Following his sixth win, he was shot down by a Fokker Triplane near Roulers and fell into captivity as a prisoner of war.

== Postwar ==
Pineau went back to motorcycle racing in the 1920s, winning many world motordrome records. Pineau did not leave aviation behind. He was instrumental in founding the Williamsport-Lycoming County Airport, and fostered it through his connections in the aviation community, including a friendship with Wiley Post.

He began the Radiant Steel company in 1928, as a spinoff from Darling Valve and Manufacturing Company. By 1948, he was its president; he served in this capacity until he retired in 1969. He died in 1972.

== See also ==
- List of World War I flying aces from the United States

== Bibliography ==
- Above the Trenches: a Complete Record of the Fighter Aces and Units of the British Empire Air Forces 1915–1920. Christopher F. Shores, Norman L. R. Franks, Russell Guest. Grub Street, 1990. ISBN 0-948817-19-4, ISBN 978-0-948817-19-9.
- Over The Front: The Complete Record of the Fighter Aces and Units of the United States and French Air Services, 1914–1918 . Franks, Norman and Frank Bailey. Grub Street Publishing, 2008. ISBN 0948817542 ISBN 978-0948817540
- Williamsport: Boomtown on the Susquehanna. Robin Van Auken, Louis E Hunsinger. Arcadia Publishing, 2003. ISBN 0-7385-2438-7, ISBN 978-0-7385-2438-2.
