= Bat No. 2 Light Roadster =

Bat No. 2
- Manufacturer: Bat Motor Manufacturing Co. Ltd
- Also called: Light Roadster
- Production: 1913
- Engine: 770 cc V-twin JAP
- Transmission: Belt drive
- Wheelbase: 54 inches (1,400 mm)
- Weight: 220 pounds (100 kg) (dry)

The Bat No. 2 was a British motorcycle made in 1913 by Bat Motor Manufacturing Co. Ltd in Penge, Surrey. Offered with a choice of Bat's own two-speed gearbox or with a conventional (for the time) belt drive, sales were good but production ended on the outbreak of the First World War one year later.

== Development ==
The Bat Motor Manufacturing Co. Ltd produced motorcycles between 1902 and 1926. The 'Bat' name is often wrongly written as BAT as people thought it came from the way the motorcycles were nicknamed Best After Tests, but it actually came from the founder, Samuel Robert Batson. Despite some competition success, Batson decided to concentrate on office equipment and sold the company to Theodore Tessier in 1904. Tessier was innovative and developed one of the first motorcycle suspension systems, with a leading link front fork. Tessler's son continued riding Bat motorcycles in competition and it was from this that the nickname was developed into a marketing slogan. The Bat No. 2 used outdated engineering even for its time, however, with no front brake. The No. 2 model was available either with Bat's own two-speed countershaft gearbox and an unusual linked spring system for the saddle and footboards, or an alternative specification (without the springs ) that had a belt drive to an Armstrong three-speed rear hub.

Although it was also known as the Light Roadster the engine was a well-proven 770cc V-twin side-valve four-stroke from Tottenham engine specialists JAP; Bat also offered 650cc, 964cc and 980cc options. The Bat No 2 also featured a specially sprung saddle to improve rider comfort on the poor roads of the time. To raise awareness of the motorcycles, Tessier began serious competitive racing and achieved over 200 wins, setting numerous speed records. Bat also managed seventh place in the 1913 Senior TT. Production ended on the outbreak of the First World War. when the factory switched to producing munitions. Bat sold all their remaining stock of Bat No. 2 motorcycles to the Russian military but was never paid, so discontinued the No. 2 after the war.

== See also ==
- List of motorcycles of the 1910s
