= Harley-Davidson Model 7D =

Model 7D
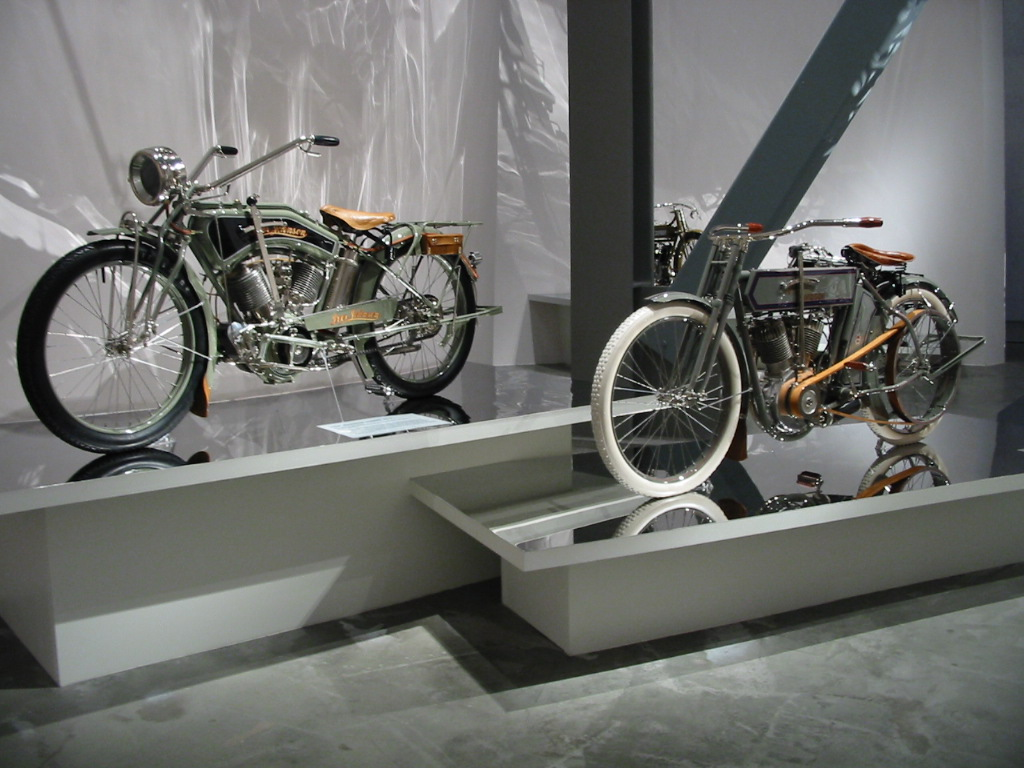
- A Model 7D (right) on display at The Art of the Motorcycle exhibition at Guggenheim Las Vegas in 2003. To the left is a 1915 Iver Johnson Model 15-7.
- Manufacturer: Harley-Davidson
- Also called: The Silent Gray Fellow
- Production: 1911 —
- Class: standard
- Engine: 49 cu in (800 cc) 45° v-twin, bore x stroke 3 x 3½"
- Top speed: 60 mph (97 km/h)
- Power: 6.5 bhp (4.8 kW)
- Transmission: Leather belt w/pulley tensioner clutch
- Suspension: Coil springs in front fork tubes, sprung saddle only in rear
- Wheelbase: 56.5 in (1,440 mm)
- Weight: 295 lb (134 kg) (dry)
- Related: 1911 Model 7A

The Harley-Davidson Model 7D of 1911 was the first successful v-twin from Harley-Davidson, inaugurating a motorcycle engine configuration that has continued unbroken from the Milwaukee motor company ever since.

In 1909, Harley had made a few examples (27 units) of another v-twin, but the design was flawed and they did not try again until two years later. In 1911, 5,625 Model 7Ds were manufactured. The Model 7D's motor was the F-head IOE engine, in use until 1929. It sold for US$300, which with inflation would be $10124 in today's currency.

Ignition was via a magneto, and the engine was started using bicycle-style pedals. Instead of a conventional clutch, a pulley belt tensioner could be moved, allowing the leather drive belt to slip. Touting its effective muffler, Harley-Davidson advertised the 7D, and the other Harleys of this era, as "The Silent Gray Fellow." The latter moniker was also in reference to William S. Harley, who was known for his quiet personality. A 1911 Model 7D from the George Pardo collection was set to be auctioned in January 2014.

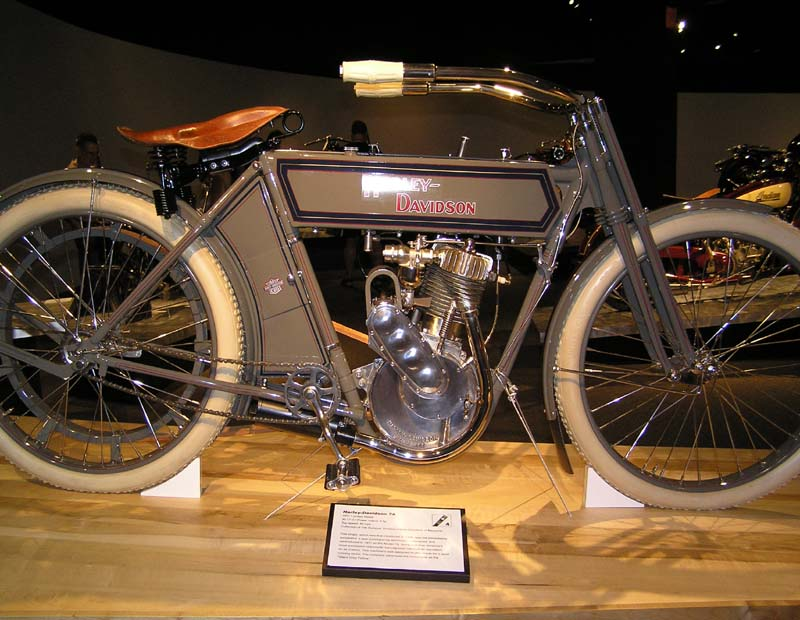
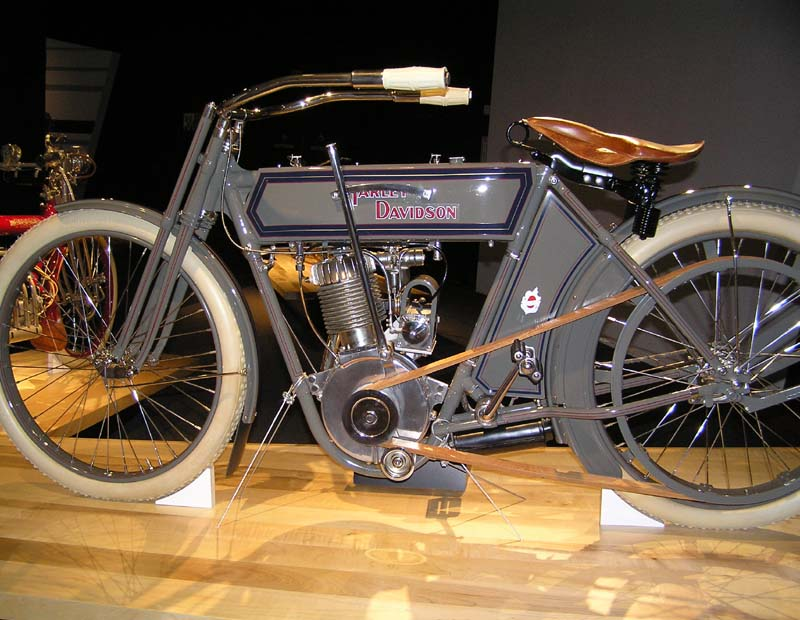
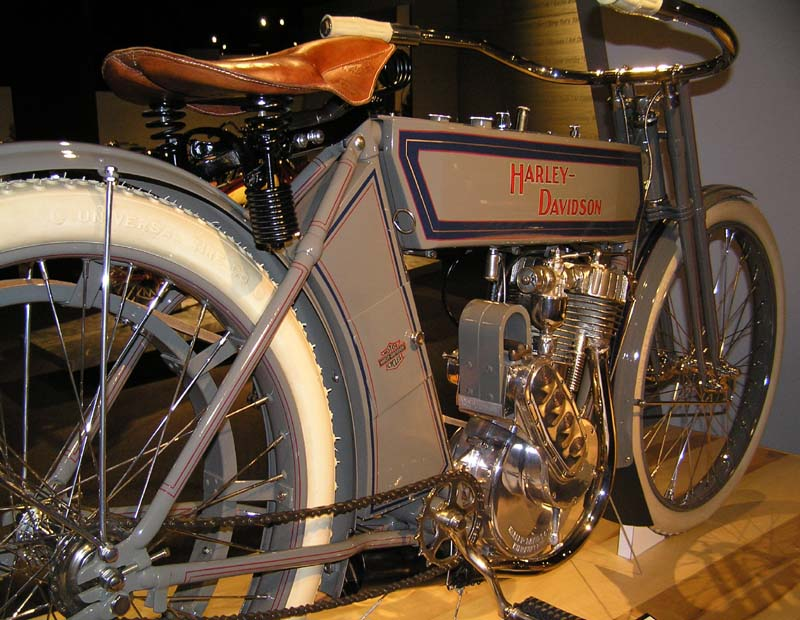
A 1911 Model 7A exhibited at The Art of the Motorcycle at Wonders Memphis. Similar to the Model 7D, but with a 30.17 cu in (494.4 cc) single and a top speed of 40 mph (64 km/h)

== See also ==
- List of Harley-Davidson motorcycles
- List of motorcycles of the 1910s
- Thor Model U
- Sears Dreadnought
- FN Four
