= ANA (motorcycle) =

Australian motorcycle

The ANA motorcycle was manufactured by Martin John Shelley at the ANA Cycle Works, 430 Rathdowne Street, Carlton North, Melbourne, Australia between 1910 and 1919.

The ANA used a wide variety of different engines: Fafnir, JAP Precision, Abingdon King Dick, as well as Sturmey-Archer gearboxes.

== See also ==
- List of motorcycles of the 1910s
