= Thor Model U =

Thor Model U was a motorcycle that debuted in the 1910s with a 7 hp V-twin in the Thor marque of Aurora Automatic Machinery Company of Illinois. The 1913 model came with a 61 ci (cubic inch) V-twin engine, with the V at an angle of 50 degrees. In 1914 the engine size was increased from 61ci to 76.25ci The motorcycle had chain drive with clutch and was overall a bicycle configuration with two handle bars and seat above a frame which housed the engine and connected the front and back. The V-twin has an angle of 50 degrees. By 1916, the Model U was essentially the "flagship" of the Thor lineup with a large 50 degree V-twin with mechanical valves, a magneto ignition, and a three speed transmission. These kind of features were improvements over typically features of the day like a single-cylinder engine, battery start, and two speed or even single speed;they were much closer to their bicycle origins they had just birthed from in the previous decade.

The motorcycle was fast for its day setting some records and also competing in the Dodge City 300 according to Bonhams. The Model U was preceded by the Model O, which had a different engine design.

Aurora Automatic Machinery Company was based out of Aurora, Illinois, USA that produced the Thor motorcycles in the early 1900s. The Model U shared parts with Model W, which had single cylinder.

== See also ==
- Sears Dreadnought
- Harley-Davidson Model 7D
- Harley-Davidson Model W
- Pope Model L
- Cyclecars
