= Hazlewoods Limited =

British bicycle manufacturer

Hazlewoods Ltd
- 1914 Single with 3-speed gearbox
- Industry: Motorcycles
- Predecessor: Warman & Hazlewood Ltd
- Founded: 1895
- Defunct: c. 1923
- Headquarters: Coventry, England
- Key people: James Hazlewood
- Products: Bicycles, motorcycles

Hazlewoods Limited of Coventry were manufacturers of bicycles from 1895, and motorcycles from 1911 until closure c. 1923. They were typical many British companies who proceeded from bicycle manufacture to motorised bicycles, a change made possible by engine and geared hub suppliers.

== Origins ==
James Hazlewood started making bicycles at Bishopsgate Green, Foleshill in Coventry from 1876 as The Hazlewood Cycle Company. In 1888 John Warman (who was manufacturing 'Rival', 'Albion', and 'Triumph' bicycles and tricycles as Warman & Co at Albion Mills) joined forces to form Warman & Hazlewood. This new company produced bicycles under the 'Albion' and 'Rival' names at Albion Mills. John Warman left the business in 1895, emigrating to America, and other members of the Hazlewood family had joined the business, which was renamed Hazlewoods Ltd. In about 1905 the business started making sidecars for motorcycles.

== Motorcycles ==
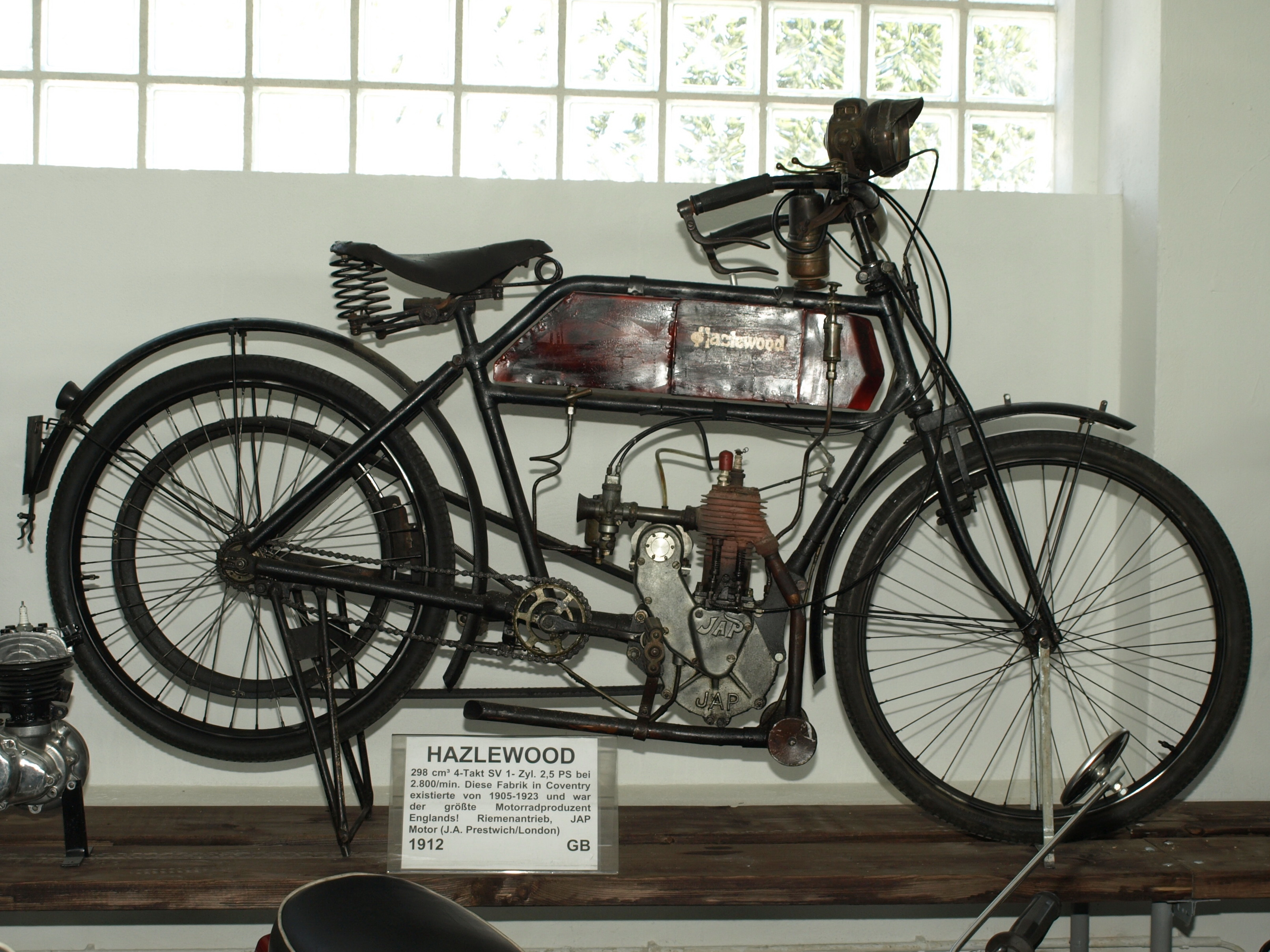
1912 Hazlewood motorcycle with a 298 cc (18.2 cu in) four-stroke single cylinder JAP engine

In 1911 they launched their own Hazlewood motorcycle built in Albion Mills, West Orchard, Coventry. There were different engine options, all of them using single cylinder or V-twin engines supplied by J.A. Prestwich (J.A.P.). The most popular model used the J.A.P. 5-6 horsepower V-twin engine (70 mm bore, 85 mm stroke). This type of engine being supplied by J.A. Prestwich to several manufacturers as being well suited to sidecar work (but also providing a powerful solo motorcycle). The smaller capacity motorcycles included one of 300 cc, of which one example survives from 1912. Gearing was provided by a three speed Armstrong rear hub, similar to the three speed hub gear used on their bicycles, which they continued to build.

In mid-1914 they updated the motorcycle design by adding a three-speed 'countershaft' gearbox complete with integral kick-start. Although Sturmey-Archer were offering a 3-speed countershaft gearbox with integral kick-start from this date, it is not clear that the one used by Hazlewood was a Sturmey-Archer product. The new gearbox required the addition of an extra down-tube at the rear of the frame. The company offered a service to existing owners to retrofit this to their machines, so earlier examples may be found with the three speed gearbox. Later in 1914 they launched a middleweight single cylinder motorcycle again using a J.A.P. engine, this time of 90 mm bore, 93 mm stroke (592 cc) rated at 4 horsepower. This used similar cycle parts to the V-twin including the three speed gearbox. A smaller engined machine with a 2-3/4 horsepower J.A.P. engine continued to be available, this using a Sturmey-Archer 3-speed hub (Sturmey-Archer bought the Armstrong-Triplex Three Speed Company from the New Hudson Cycle Company in 1914).

During the 1914-1918 war Hazlewoods had to suspend motorcycle production "being engaged in munitions of war".

A 1922 V-twin example of the motorcycle complete with sidecar is on display at the Coventry Transport Museum. From an advert of the period the engines sizes available in 1922 for the sidecars were 770 cc or 976 cc. The company continued to make smaller motorcycles, including 292 cc and 346 cc solo machines, all using J.A.P. engines. These later examples could be had with rear chain drive (instead of belt drive). Hazlewoods displayed motorcycles at the Olympia Motorcycle Show at the end of 1922, however production ceased around 1923–1924.

A new company was formed in c. 1926, "The New Hazlewood Cycle Co.", however this was short-lived and failed in 1928.

== See also ==
- List of motorcycles of the 1910s
