= Lanchester 8 hp Phaeton =

Overview
- Manufacturer: Lanchester Motor Company
- Production: 1895–1900
- Designer: Frederick Lanchester

Body and chassis
- Body style: Individually coachbuilt

Powertrain
- Engine: 2,895 cc (176.7 cu in) twin-cylinder air-cooled
- Transmission: Epicyclic gearbox

The Lanchester 8 hp Phaeton is a brass era automobile designed by Frederick W. Lanchester, developed and built by the Lanchester Motor Company, produced between 1895 and 1900. It was notably the first production vehicle to be powered by a flat twin-cylinder engine.
