= John Birch (engineer) =

English automotive engineer

John North Birch (1867–1945) was born in Foleshill, Warwickshire, England, and trained as an engineer. He constructed his own pushbikes (bicycle) and automobiles. Birch also used the first names George and William (Bill) while in New Zealand.

== Early life and career ==
Birch was one of 11 children and eldest son of a Foleshill ribbon manufacturer. He completed an engineering apprenticeship with a Coventry engineering firm which produced steam engines. About 1884 he joined bicycle manufacturers Starley Brothers of Coventry. The following year he moved to Sheffield and worked in a railway carriage factory. From there he worked in a steel foundry before returning to Nuneaton in 1888.

Birch married Hannah Taylor of Exhall, near Coventry, in 1892. They had three daughters.

== George Eliot motor cycles ==
About 1888 Birch built a pushbike with an oil retaining hub, an invention of his which is universally used in cycle production. He named it the Foleshill and this pushbike proved popular and included among its purchasers Dennis brothers of Guildford. Moving his business to Princes Street, Nuneaton, in 1898, Birch renamed his bike the George Eliot after the author of the same name. Here he employed some 20 people, including his brothers Harold and Fred.

About 1900 Birch built his first motorcycle, which he also named the George Eliot. The bike had three innovations: the engine was positioned where the pedals are on a bicycle, the engine was built into the frame, and it had a low-tension magneto superseding the battery type ignition. Two of his bikes were shown at the 1902 Stanley Show. The brochure from the show described them as

one (is) fitted with Simms' Magneto in conjunction with Birch's advance sparking apparatus. This machine is constructed with Birch's patent combined crank chamber and bottom bracket built in the frame; surface carburetter (carburetor), belt drive, Birch's disc hubs, and compound brake. The other has a surface carburetter, wipe contact, accumulator, trembler coil, and self-compensating contact

In 1903 the bike was awarded a first class diploma for reliability. In July 1904 Birch and F W Marston rode one from John o' Groats to Land's End.

In 1903 Birch sold the right to construct these bikes to Bradbury Motor Cycles, which produced them under the Peerless brand. His brother also continued to manufacture them until 1925 under the name George Eliot. In 1905 Birch left his family in England, intending to return within 5 years. He never did, but kept in contact through correspondence.

Birch immigrated to New Zealand in 1905.

== Marlborough Engineering Limited ==
In 1908 Birch worked with Miles Cheesman at Birch and Co, Blenheim, New Zealand. He started his own firm, Marlborough Engineering Limited, in 1912. There he developed and constructed a motor car, which he named Marlborough after the province, between 1912 and 1920. It was a touring car, had a four-cylinder engine with a four-inch bore and seven-inch stroke, five main bearings, and full force feed lubrication. Valves were two-and-a-half inches across the face, cam lift was half an inch. The Marlborough was thought to be capable of over 100 miles an hour on a good straight road with a good set of tyres. In the same period he also built several marine and stationary engines, plus the huge marine engine which ended up in a Mr McManaway's launch the Marlborough. James Fuller of Seddon bought the first Marlborough car in 1920. It lasted up to the 1940s when it was broken up for scrap. Only the motor remained and this is now held in a Blenheim's Brayshaw Heritage Park.

In 1915 Birch is believed to have created a shrapnel shell for the New Zealand Army. Newspaper reports of the day refer to George Birch of Blenheim as being its creator.

=== Trouble with a motor ===
During the war period Birch constructed a marine engine for a Blenheim farmer, Thomas Davies, and garage owner, Edward Parker. Construction proved more difficult and expensive than originally assessed by Birch and resulted in litigation. In June 1918 Birch was ordered to pass the motor to Davies but either refused or could not and was jailed over the matter. Having served almost a year in jail, Birch was released on the understanding he would supply Davies with the engine. This did not happen to Davies satisfaction and the case was returned to Court in October 1919. Davies claimed parts were missing and Birch said that they had never been in his possession. It was this engine that finally ended up in McManaway's launch after being discovered at Picton some years later.

== Carlton Car Company ==
After making his first car, Birch moved in 1922 to Gisborne. While working as a foreman for Collett Motors, he built three more cars. These were renamed Carlton. Both the second and third cars were extensively damaged by fire, but the second car was redesigned and sold as a three-ton truck and the third car was used for spare parts by the owner of the truck. In the 1950s, the truck was recovered from a swamp and rebuilt as a car by the Gisborne Vintage Car Club. The rebuild was completed in 1998.

Birch's fourth and final car, the baby Carlton, was completed about 1928. In 1930 a prospectus was published to raise £7,000 and a new company called the NZ Motor Manufacturing Co Ltd was formed. One financial columnist of the day commented that the prospectus lacked sufficient detail to make a reasonable assessment. It did note that the car was to be a six-cylinder front-wheel drive.

Insufficient funds and the Great Depression ended Birch's car company and he built no more cars after that.

== Death ==
Birch died at Gisborne, New Zealand, on 19 February 1945 and is buried at Taruheru Cemetery. He was 77.

== Photographs ==
- 1904 George Eliot motor cycle
- 1903 Bradbury Peerless based on Birch's patented vertical engine
- Marlborough
- Carlton at Gisborne after construction (although the article calls it the Marlborough, this second car was a Carlton)
- Remains of the Carlton in 1961

== See also ==
- List of car manufacturers of the United Kingdom
