= Bradbury Motor Cycles =

Former British motorcycle manufacturer

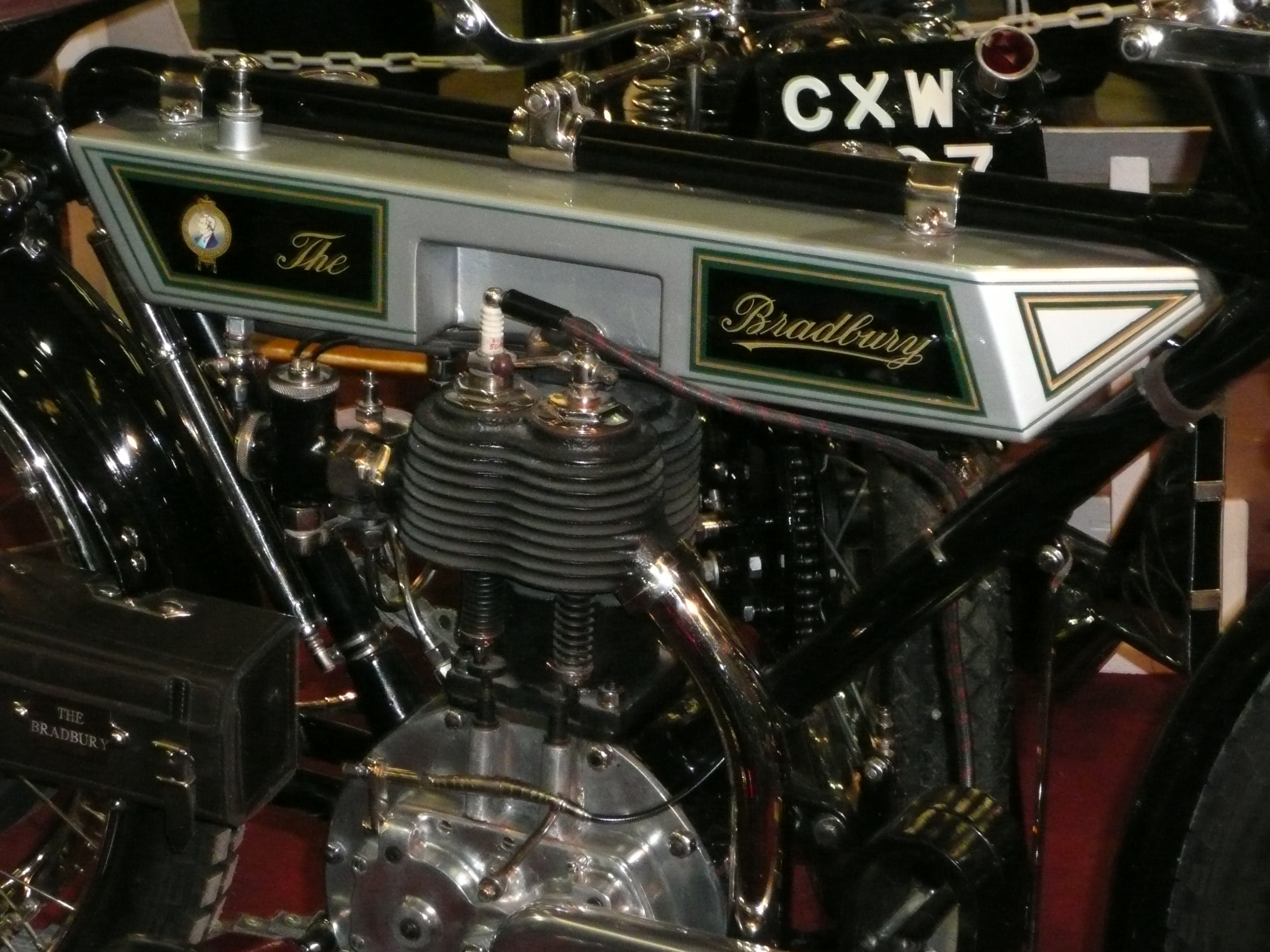
- Company type: Private
- Industry: Motorcycle
- Founded: 1902
- Defunct: 1924
- Headquarters: Oldham, United Kingdom
- Products: Motorcycles

Bradbury Motor Cycles was a British motorcycle manufacturer based in Oldham, England and established in 1902. Originally involved in the manufacture of machine tools, sewing machines and cycles, their first motorcycles were bicycles with clip-on Minerva engines. The Bradbury factory went on to develop and produce a range of single-cylinder motorcycle, V-twins and horizontally opposed twins. The 1912 Bradbury motorcycles were one of the earliest with variable gearing. Although the factory survived the First World War it closed in 1924.

== History ==
The company was established in 1852 as Bradbury & Co., and was Britain's and Europe's first sewing machine manufacturer. The first Bradbury bicycle appeared as early as 1895, and production continued until at least 1914. The company began manufacturing and marketing motorcycles in 1902 under the name Bradbury Motor Cycles. Their first motorcycle was a bicycle fitted with a 1¾ hp Minerva clip-on engine. In 1903 they began producing motorcycles with 2 hp (1.5 kW) engines which they called the Peerless Motor Cycle. These were based on a design by John Birch. In 1904 Bradbury launched a new 2.5 hp (1.9 kW) motorcycle with a new frame design and in 1905 their Peerless motorcycle won a special 1,000-mile (1,600 km) reliability trial.

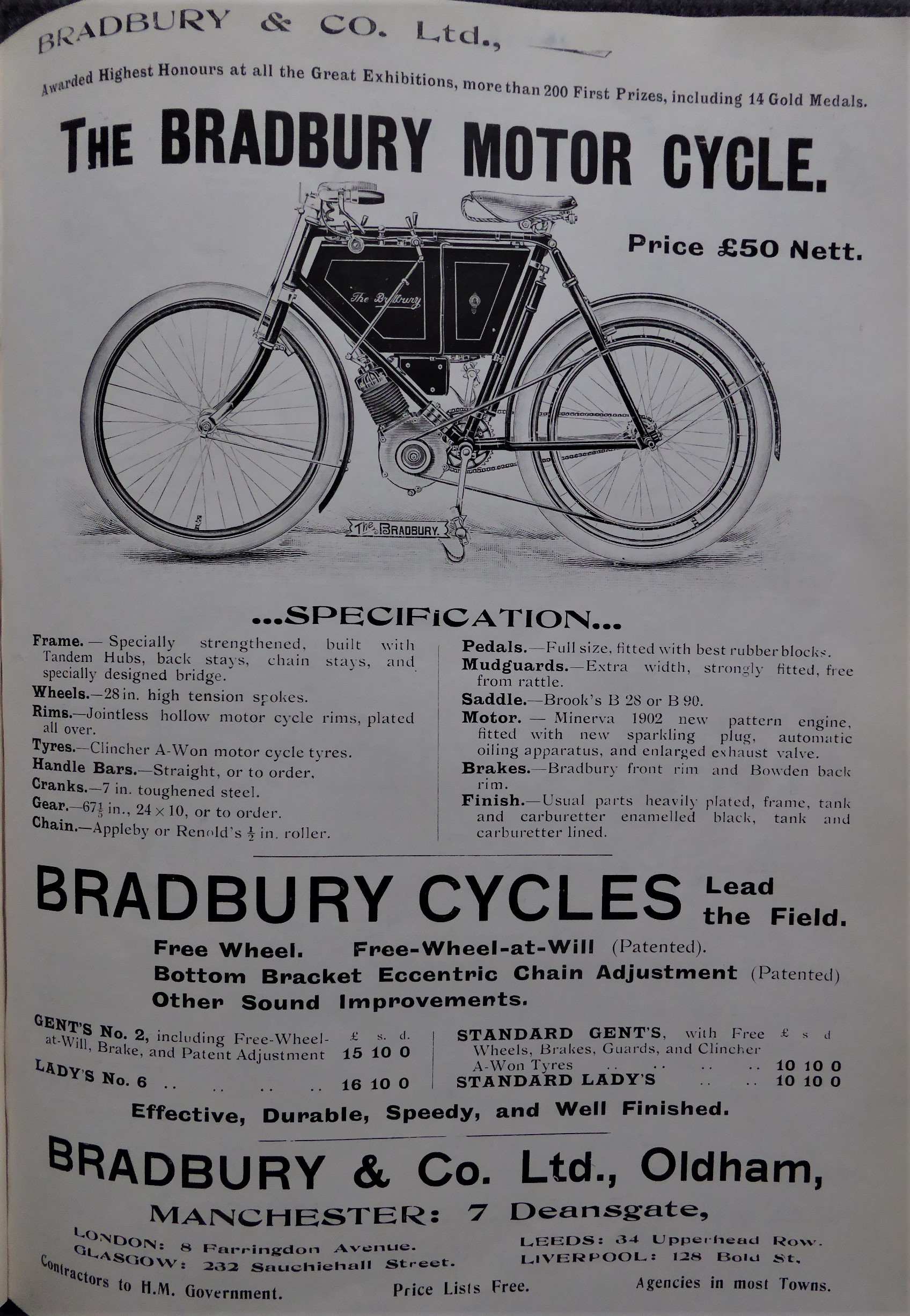
Advertisement from 1902

In 1909, the Bradbury 3.5 hp (2.6 kW) motorcycle was launched and advertised as "the finest hill climber (power for power) ever made". By 1910 Bradbury Motor Cycles had won over 300 first prizes including 18 gold medals in hill climbing competitions.

In 1910, Bradbury developed the fittings of the 1909 Model and in 1911 launched the Speed model. The 1911 Standard model also had Dunlop non-skid tyres and the saddle was padded. In 1911 H. Gibson and J. Eastwood completed the 390-mile (630 km) Irish 'End to End' trial in 14 hours 9½ minutes on a Bradbury motorcycle.

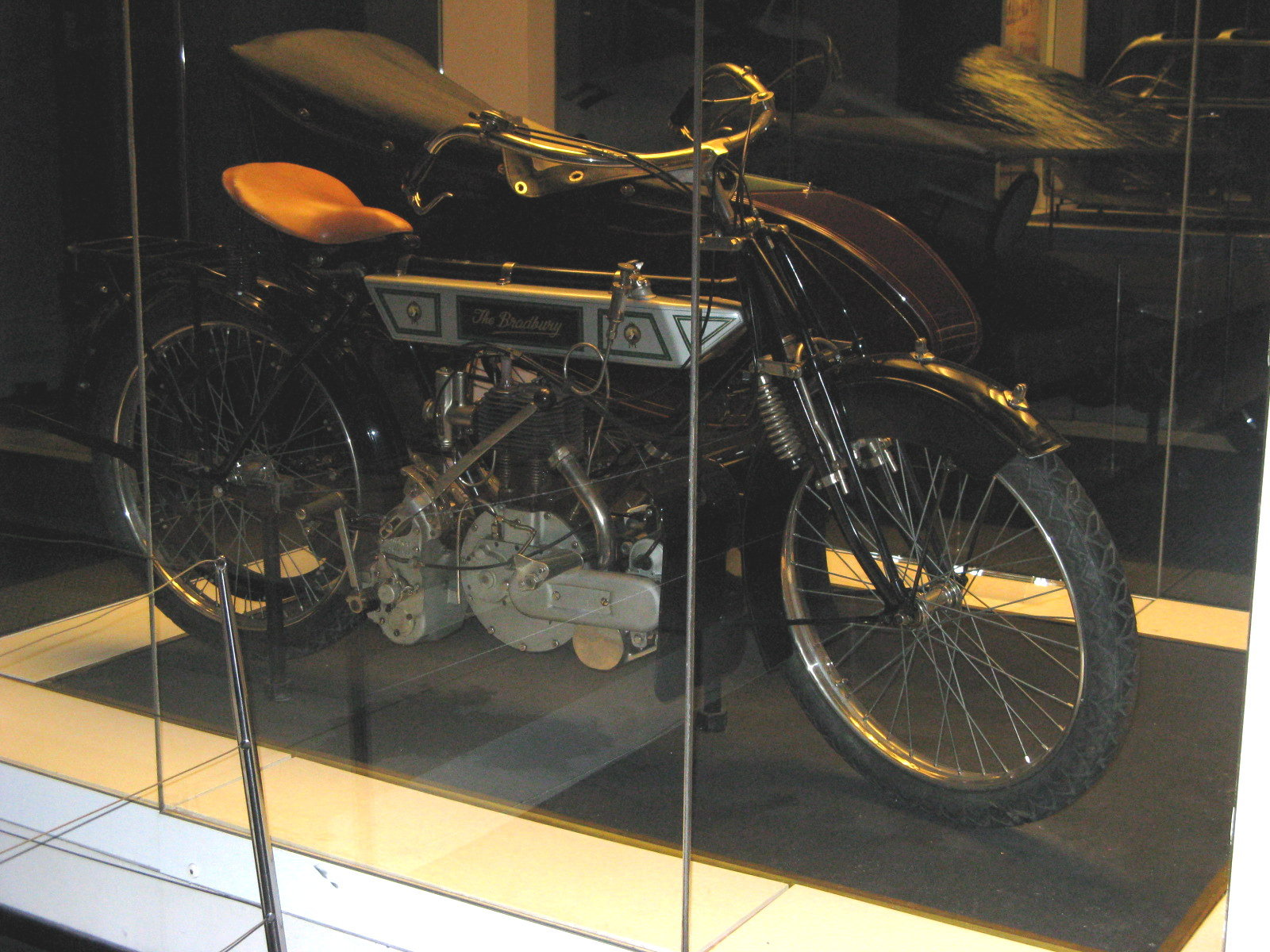
Bradbury motorcycle

In 1912, the range was expanded to include a special Model-de-Luxe with a side car made of wicker. In 1914, the 3.5 horsepower (2.6 kW) single-cylinder engine was upgraded to 4 hp (3.0 kW) a new three-speed twin cylinder engine was introduced as the Bradbury 6 hp (4.5 kW) three-speed twin V-Type 750 cc. The V-type engine had the cylinders at a 50° angle and came with up to seven versions of the side cars ranging from a Tradesman's Carrier to the de-Luxe coach built option. The new twin-cylinder 3½ hp Bradbury 500 cc was also launched with the cylinders horizontally opposed and fitted with a kick start. In 1912, Bradbury riders H. Gibson and G. Wray completed the 886 miles (1,426 km) John o' Groats to Lands End journey in 38 hours 47 minutes. Reducing the previous record for a motor cycle and side-car by 2 hours.

In 1913, a Bradbury motor cycle won the Transvaal Speed Championship. Also in 1913 Bradbury motorcycles participated in the Scottish Six Days Trial. In the 1914 six-day trial based in Sheffield the chassis of the Bradbury 6 hp broke and as a consequence Bradbury were excluded from the War Department Trials. However the company did supply Naval Authorities with 4 hp (3.0 kW) motorcycles with a 3-speed counter shaft gear.

After the First World War Bradbury produced a range of 4 hp 554 cc single-cylinder motorcycles as well as the 6 hp (4.5 kW) 750 cc twin and a 2.75 hp (2.05 kW) 350 cc single. In 1922, the range was redesigned with a new frame and fuel tank and a new Bradbury 8 hp (6.0 kW) 996 cc V-type twin was launched with an optional side car.

In 1922, R. E. Dicker set four British and World records at Brooklands on a 6 hp Bradbury sports motorcycle. Sales were slow, however, and the Bradbury factory closed in 1924.

== The Muratti Trophy ==
The Muratti Trophy was presented to the Ulster Centre of the Motorcycle Union of Ireland by B. Muratti Sons and Co Ltd., a well known Manchester-based cigarette maker. The silver trophy features a winged figure on a Bradbury motorcycle. James Stewart won the event three times between 1907 and 1909 and was awarded the trophy outright. In 1987 the Muratti Trophy was auctioned by Phillips for £12,000.
