= Flying Merkel =

American motorcycle (1911–15)

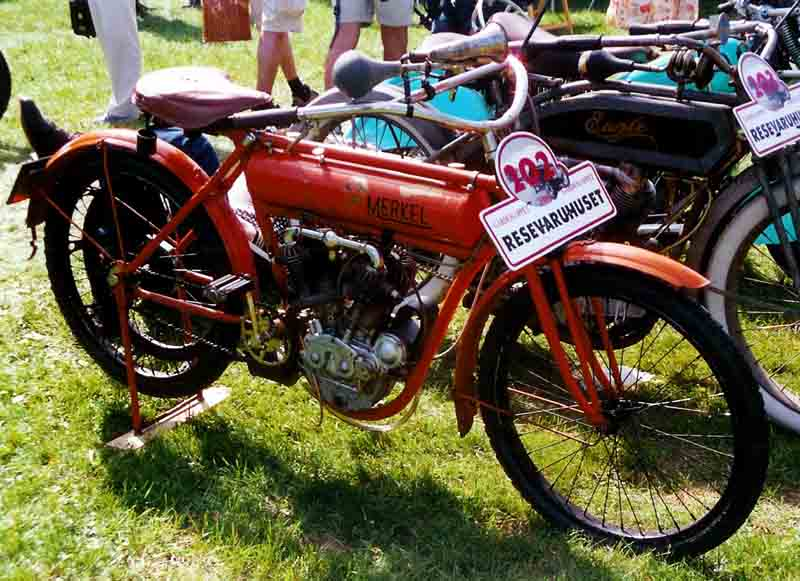
Flying Merkel of 1909.

The Flying Merkel was a motorcycle of the American company Merkel in Milwaukee, which relocated later to Middletown, Ohio. The motorcycle was produced from 1911 to 1915.

== Early days ==
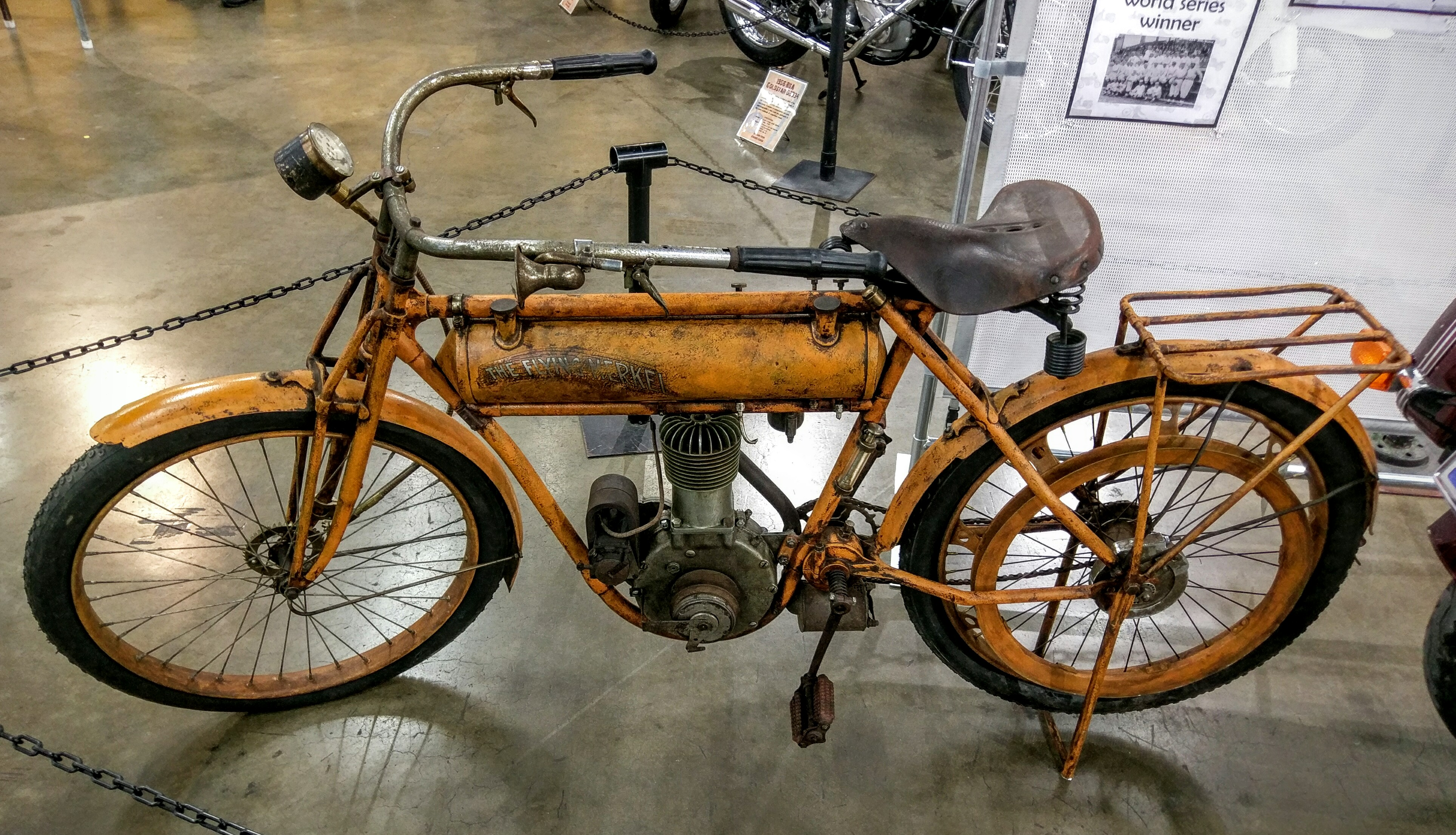
1912 Flying Merkel Model W-S, on display at the California Automobile Museum.

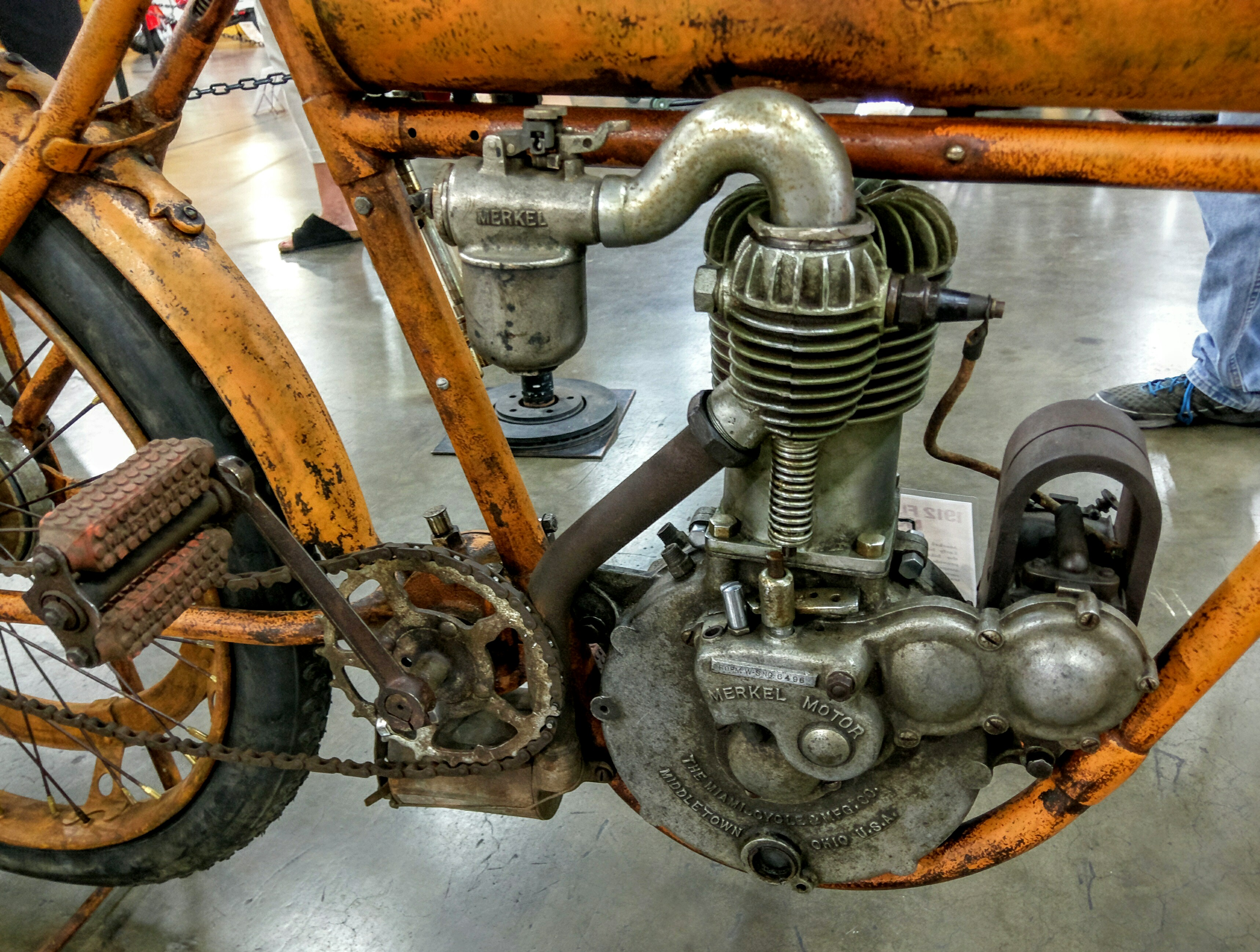
1912 Flying Merkel engine.

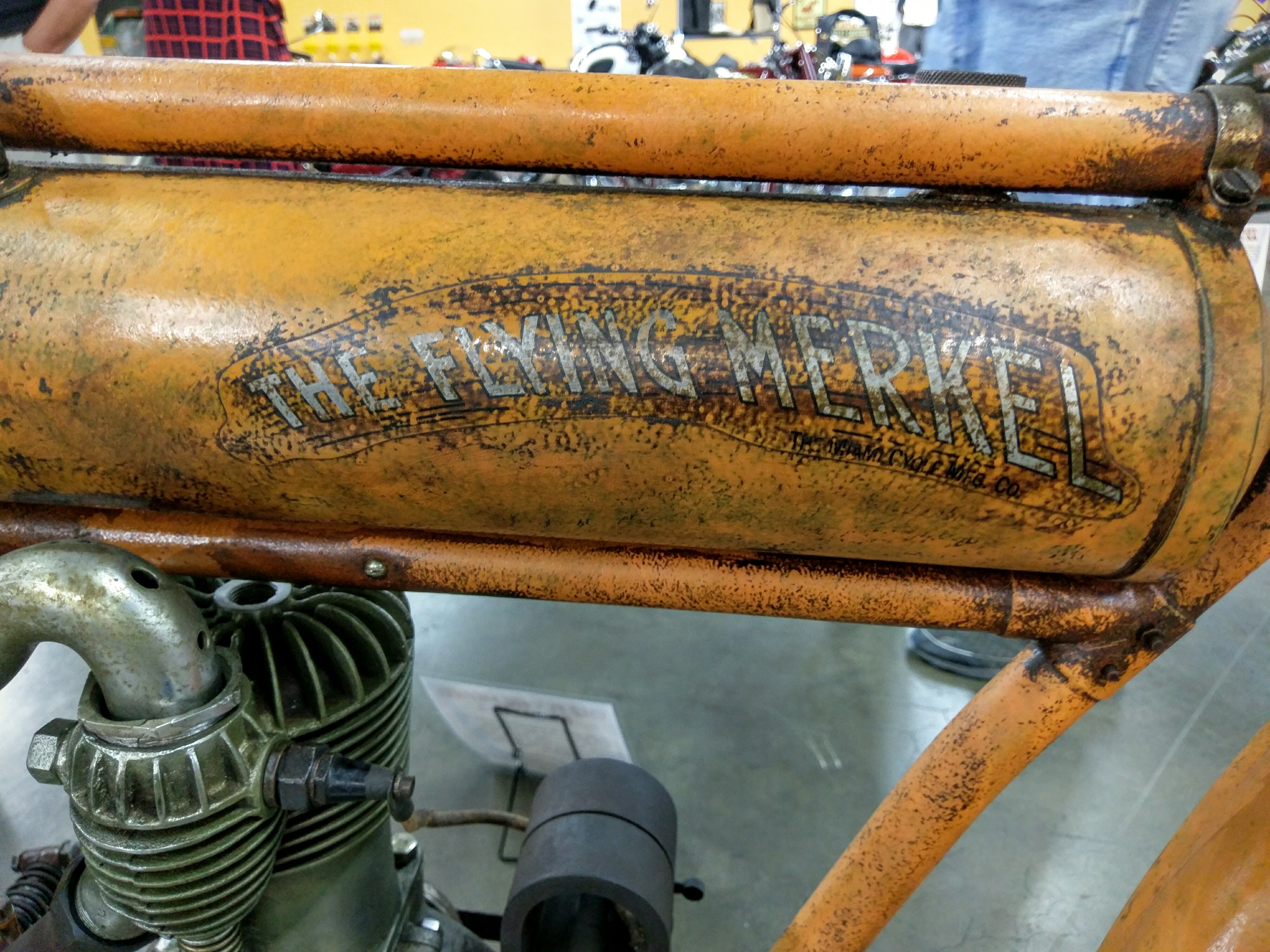
Flying Merkel emblem.

The founder of the company, Joe Merkel, began designing engines for motorcycles in 1902, and built his own motorcycles beginning in 1903, including a one-cylinder engine with a capacity of 316 cc, which was also used in the contemporary Indian. In 1908, he set up a company under the name of Light Manufacturing and Foundry Company in Pottstown, Pennsylvania. His motorcycles displayed the trademark "Merkel Light" on the tank. In 1910, he offered the first two-cylinder engine. In 1911, the company was taken over by Miami Cycle and Manufacturing Company of Middletown, Ohio. Subsequently, the trademark was changed to "Flying Merkel", and a bright and shiny orange paint was used, which was later described as "Merkel orange".

== Technology ==
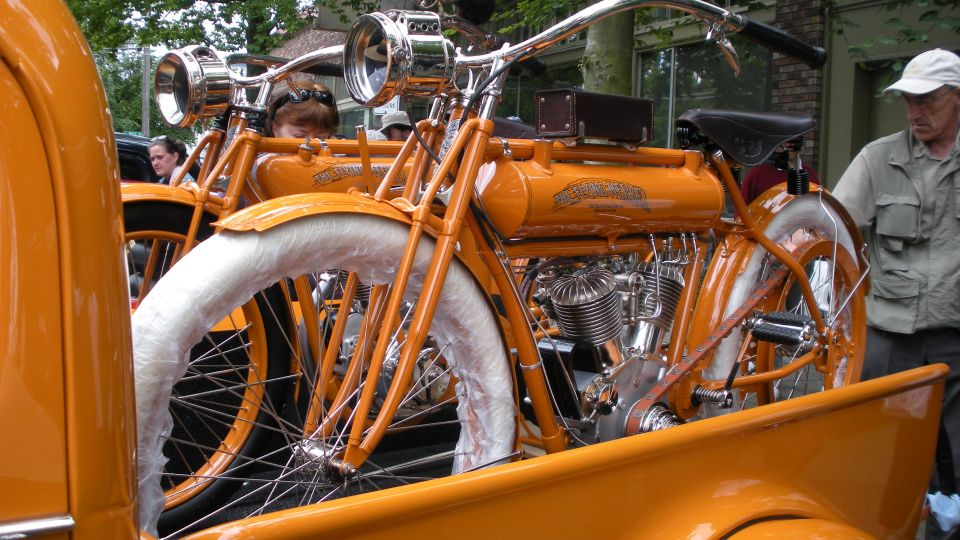
Merkel Orange replica of 1911 model.

The Flying Merkel had a conservative engine-control system featuring an automatic inlet valve and a preset outlet valve. The V engine initially displaced 884 cc (53.9 cu in) and delivered 6 hp (4.5 kW), through a two-speed gearbox and a belt drive, for a maximum speed of 97 km/h (60 mph). A motorsports version without brake was available with a 997 cc (60.8 cu in) engine, including roller bearings, Bosch magneto ignition, Schebler carburetor, and chain drive. The roadworthy version had a band brake on the rear wheel and was sold for US$325.

An innovation was the motorcycle fork, patented by Joe Merkel as a "truss fork", which could be seen as a predecessor of the telescopic fork. The Flying Merkel had an automatically dripping oil feeder, which was subsequently copied by Indian and Harley-Davidson. In 1913, a new model appeared; the engine had now an automatically controlled inlet valve and a spring-loaded kickstarter. Production ceased in 1915. The Flying Merkel achieved its iconic status through the shape of its tank and the colorful body paint.

== At auction ==
A replica of the racing version was auctioned in January 2012 at Bonhams for nearly €30,000. A 1911 Flying Merkel Board Track Racer went for US$423,500 in 2015 and a 1911 Flying Merkel for US$201,250 in 2011.

== Revival ==
Currently, Greg Merkel, the great-great-grandnephew of Joe Merkel, has taken ownership of the trademark "Flying Merkel" and has started a revival of the brand called "Flying Merkel Inc".

== Riders ==
- Cleo Francis Pineau
- Maldwyn Jones

== See also ==
- List of motorcycle manufacturers
- List of motorcycles of the 1910s
- List of motorcycles of 1900 to 1909
