= Indian Model O =

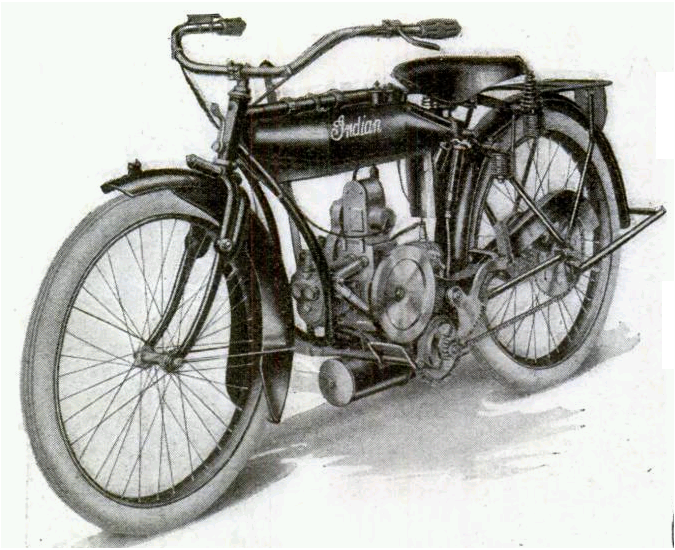
- 1917 Indian Model O Light Twin
- Manufacturer: Indian
- Also called: Indian Light Twin, "Model Nothing"
- Parent company: Hendee Manufacturing Company
- Production: 1917–1919
- Assembly: Springfield, Massachusetts, USA
- Predecessor: Indian Model K Featherweight
- Class: Lightweight standard
- Engine: 15.7 cu in (257 cc) flathead flat-twin
- Bore / stroke: 2.0 in × 2.5 in (50.8 mm × 63.5 mm)
- Top speed: 36 mph (58 km/h)
- Power: 4 hp (3.0 kW)
- Transmission: 3-speed manual, hand shift
- Suspension: Front: pivoting fork, replaced in 1917 by trailing-link fork Rear: none, rigid
- Brakes: Front: none Rear: contracting band

The Indian Model O was a lightweight motorcycle made by the Hendee Manufacturing Company from 1917 to 1919. Indian expected to sell the Model O to young or thrifty riders. The United States' entry into World War I caused Indian to shift manufacture to military motorcycles, and the low cost of the Ford Model T caused the market for lightweight motorcycles to collapse.

== Concept and design ==
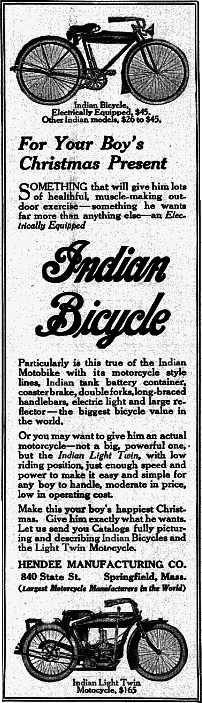
Advertisement in the December 1916 issue of Boys' Life pitching Indian bicycles and Indian Model O motorcycles as Christmas presents for sons

The Model O was designed as an entry-level motorcycle to attract young riders. It replaced the two-stroke single-cylinder Model K Featherweight, which was made in 1916 only. In a layout similar to contemporary Douglas motorcycles from Great Britain, the Model O's flathead flat-twin engine was mounted with its cylinders along the line of the frame. This added smooth operation to the Model K's existing light weight and practicality.

The Model O had a cradle frame supporting the engine at the bottom of the crankcase, while the gearbox was mounted under the frame, below the rear cylinder. The rear wheel was rigidly mounted to a subframe bolted to the frame. The front suspension was initially a pivoting fork used on the Indian Single from 1906 to 1910 and on the Model K Featherweight. This was replaced during 1917 by a leaf-sprung trailing link fork.

== Reception ==
The Model O was released in 1917, the year in which the United States entered World War I. Indian diverted its efforts to selling motorcycles to the US military. The appeal of lightweight motorcycles as transport was also eroded by the availability of mass-produced cars, especially the Ford Model T, for which mass production began in 1913. The Model O was not designed to appeal to enthusiasts, to which enthusiasts replied by calling the motorcycle the "Model Nothing". The Model O continued to sell poorly until 1919, when it was discontinued.

== Legacy ==
In 1919, the year in which the Model O was discontinued, Harley-Davidson introduced its Model W Sport Twin. The Model W had a Douglas-like layout similar to that of the Model O, using a flat-twin engine with a transverse crankshaft and cylinders parallel to the frame. Larger and more powerful than the Model O, the Model W had several innovations, including unit construction of engine and transmission, an enclosed drivetrain, and a coil-sprung trailing link fork. The Model W sold well in its first year, but sales fell after that, and it was discontinued in 1923.
