= Sears Dreadnought =

Motorcycle sold by Sears in the 1910s

Sears Dreadnought was a motorcycle sold by Sears in the 1910s. The motorcycle featured a 70.62-cubic-inch (1,157.3 cm^{3}) V-twin made by Spacke. It was sourced from Spacke's cyclecar and had 9 horsepower (6.7 kW). This engine was also used by Dayton, Eagle, Minneapolis and Crawford. In addition to the internal combustion engine, it also had foot-pedals like a regular bicycle. (This was for getting the engine started as the kick start had not been invented yet.)

The motorcycle was designed for Sears in conjunction with Excelsior Company of N. Sangamon Street, Chicago. They put together popular components and features of the period including the Spacke V-twin engine, a Schebler carburetor, Musselman hub, chain drive, etc. It was offered with various options such as a two-speed hub and a lighting package.

Sears sold the motorcycle like its other products via mail order for $250 in 1913 ($7,954 in 2024 dollars). People would shop out of large catalog of thousands of items rather than the local store, then the product would be delivered to them. Sears sold motorcycles from 1912 to 1916. The motorcycle is also called the Sears De Luxe Dreadnought Twin. DeLuxe was the marque of the Spacke engine company and was on the engine itself.

By the year 2001 it was thought about ten Sears Dreadnoughts remain, and one went for a Sotheby's auction for over US$100,000. By the end of the 20th century the motorcycles of this era were lauded as works of art, being featured for example in the prestigious Guggenheim Museums.

== Features ==
- 9 horsepower (6.7 kW) V-twin by Spacke Machine Company of Indianapolis, Indiana
- Schebler Model H carburetor
- Bosch magneto
- Eclipse pulley and clutch

== See also ==
- Thor Model U (A contemporary of the Sears model in the 1910s)
- Harley-Davidson Model 7D (another contemporary, came out in 1911)
- FN Four (a Belgian motorcycle of the period)
- List of motorcycles of the 1910s
