= Harley-Davidson Model W =

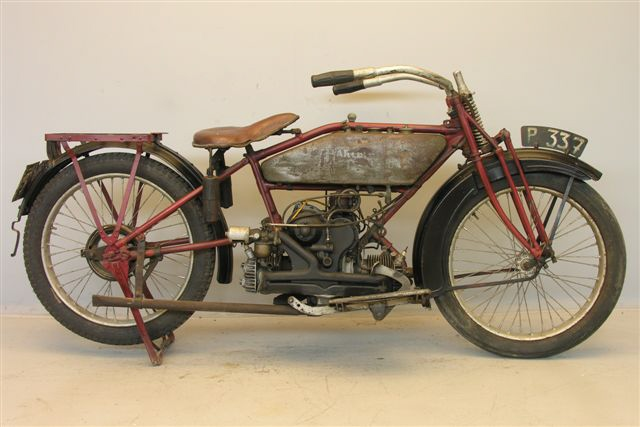
- 1921 Harley-Davidson Model W
- Manufacturer: Harley-Davidson
- Also called: Sport Twin
- Production: 1919–1923
- Assembly: Milwaukee, WI USA
- Engine: 35.64 cu in (584.0 cc) side valve flat-twin
- Bore / stroke: 2.75 in × 3.00 in (69.9 mm × 76.2 mm)
- Compression ratio: 3.75:1
- Power: 6 hp (4.5 kW)
- Ignition type: magneto (W, WF) battery and coil (WJ)
- Transmission: 3-speed manual
- Frame type: tubular steel, single downtube
- Suspension: front: trailing link with single coil spring rear: none, rigid
- Brakes: front: none rear: contracting band
- Tires: 26 in × 3 in (660 mm × 76 mm)
- Wheelbase: 57 in (1,448 mm)
- Weight: 265 lb (120 kg) (dry)
- Fuel capacity: 2.75 US gal (10.4 L)
- Oil capacity: 2 US qt (1.9 L)

The Harley-Davidson Model W, also known as the Sport Twin, is a motorcycle made by Harley-Davidson from 1919 to 1923. Unusually for a Harley-Davidson motorcycle, the Model W had a flat-twin engine and a trailing link fork. The Model W set speed records on runs from New York City to Chicago and from the Canada–United States border to the Mexico–United States border. Slow home market sales led to the end of production after four years.

== Design ==
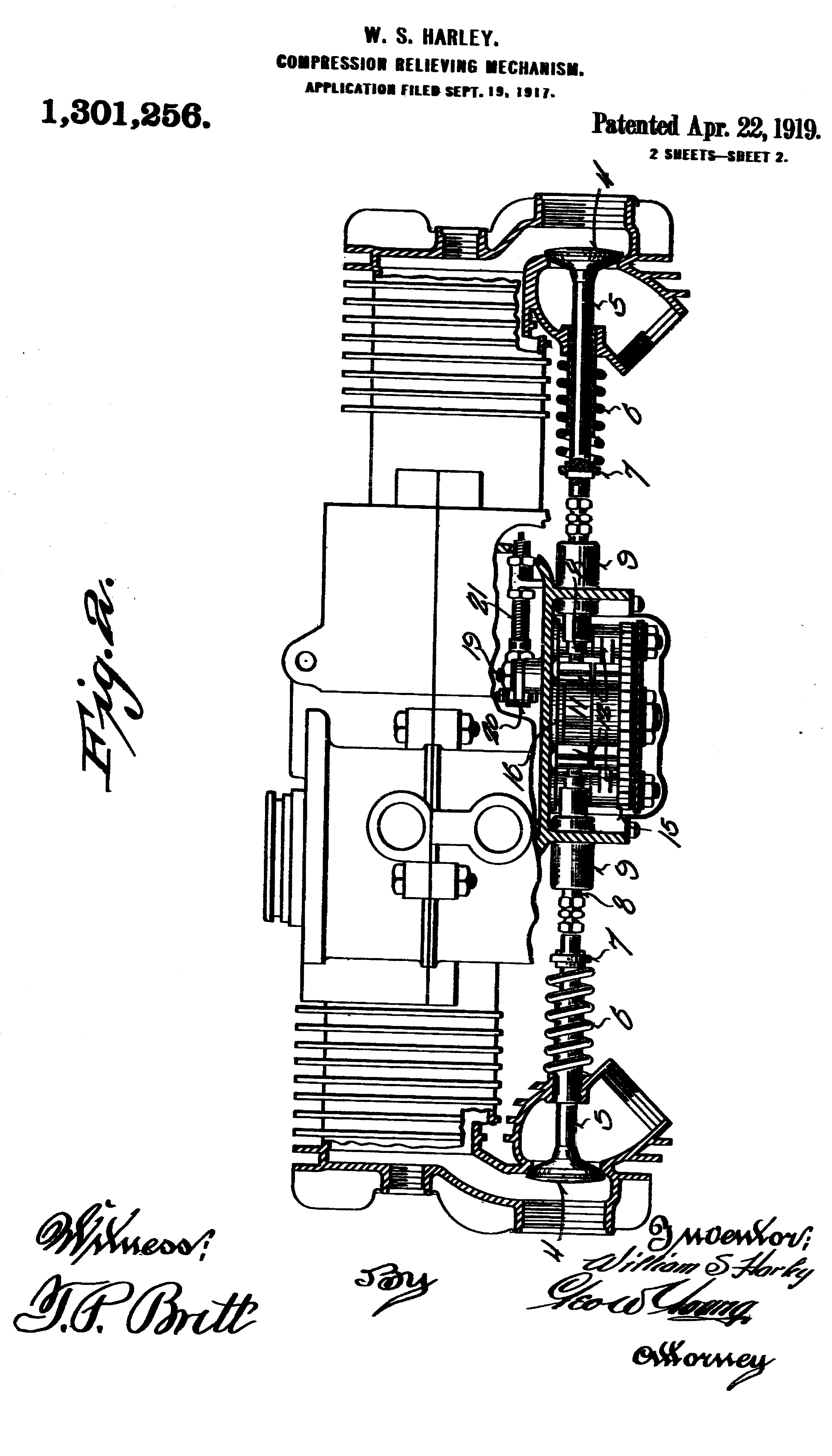
W. S. Harley's patented compression release system. Note the screw caps in the cylinder heads giving access to the valves.

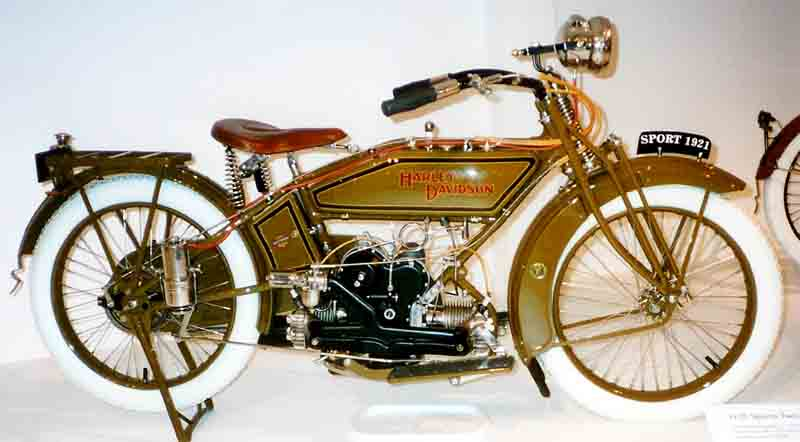
1922 Harley-Davidson WJ

Harley-Davidson's intention in introducing a new middleweight model was to increase the size of the motorcycle market by appealing to new riders with an entry-level product. The design imitated the British Douglas motorcycle flat-twin with cylinders in line with the frame, and offered several features that were meant to bring new motorcyclists into the market, including a smoother running engine than a typical Harley-Davidson V-twin, a lower center of gravity for easier handling, and a design that kept the rider and the motorcycle cleaner from oil and the dirt that oil attracted. It was cleaner because there were fewer oil compartments, due to the transmission and clutch being integrated with the engine crankcase, providing fewer ways for the oil to leak. In addition, an optional drive chain enclosure could keep chain lubricant off the motorcycle and the rider's clothing.

=== Drivetrain ===
The engine components were designed for ease of access and maintenance. The valve guides and valves could be removed without removing the engine from the motorcycle. The cylinder heads were integral with the engine. The intake and exhaust manifolds were cast as one piece such that the exhaust would heat the fuel mixture to improve fuel atomization. The engine had a large external flywheel on the left side similar to that on the horizontal single-cylinder Moto Guzzi.

The Model W engine was Harley-Davidson's first flathead engine, and its transmission was the first in a Harley-Davidson motorcycle to be housed in the engine cases. The transmission included helical gear drive, a wet clutch, and a three-speed gearbox. The engine was a stressed member of the frame.

=== Suspension ===
The front suspension was by a trailing-link fork, unlike those on other Harley-Davidsons, which used leading-link forks at the time.

=== Electrical system and ignition ===
The Model W initially used a magneto-powered ignition system, but a battery and coil system became available with the Model WJ in 1921. The Model WF continued with magneto ignition. Electric lighting became available on the Model W in 1920.

=== Accessories and trim ===
The Model W had a standard luggage carrier on the rear fender. In 1921, the tank logos were changed to be similar to those on Harley-Davidson's larger V-twin motorcycles.

== Endurance records ==
In July 1919, the Model W became the first motor vehicle of any kind to climb Mount San Antonio, near Mount Baldy, California. A contractor rode a Model W 1,200 miles through Death Valley surveying sites for hotels and rail lines, without problems with the motorcycle. Hap Scherer, a publicity manager for Harley-Davidson, set record times on endurance runs from British Columbia to Tijuana and from New York to Chicago.

== Demise ==
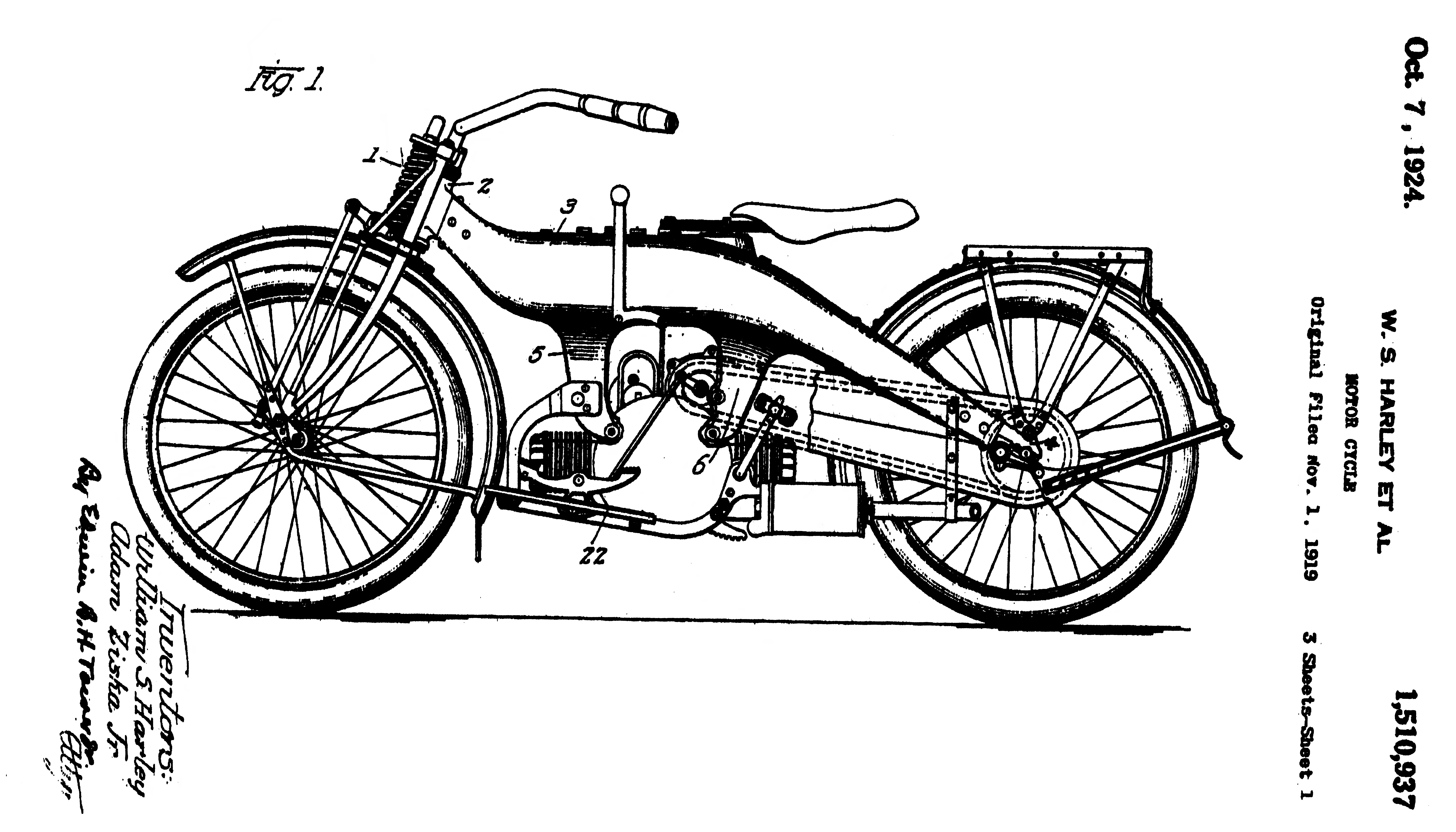
Beam-framed motorcycle with Model W drivetrain, patented by W. S. Harley and A. Ziska Jr.

The Model W never sold well in the United States, and the expected crowd of new riders taking up motorcycling on Sport Twins did not appear. In 1920, a year after the introduction of the Model W, Indian began offering their Scout, which was similar in size, faster, and much more popular. The Model W cost more than a used Ford Model T and about nine-tenths the cost of Harley-Davidson's one litre V-Twin motorcycle, making it attractive neither as basic transportation nor as a sporting vehicle. Although the Model W sold well in Europe, Harley-Davidson discontinued it in 1923 in favor of promoting their single-cylinder models there.

William S. Harley and Adam Ziska Jr. patented a steel beam frame design for use with the Model W drivetrain.

== Collection and exhibition ==
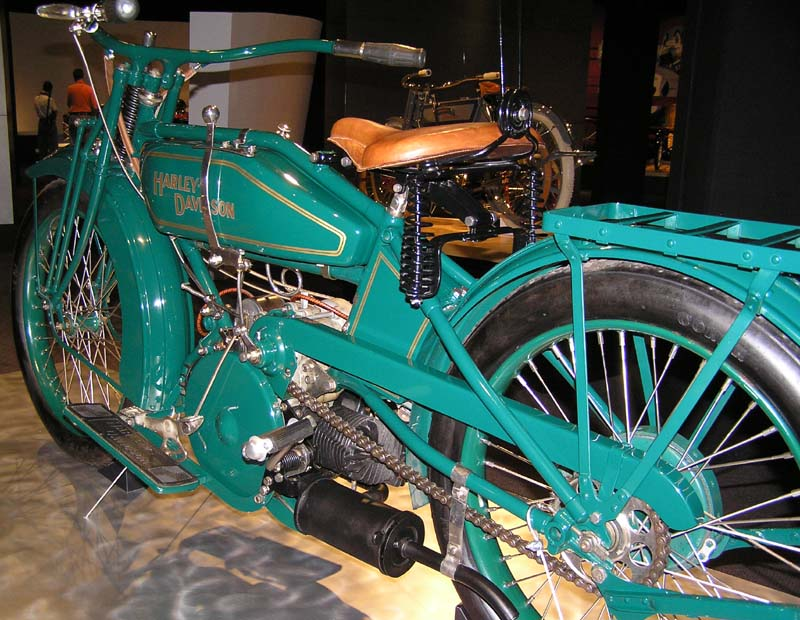
1919 Harley-Davidson Model W on display at the Spring 2005 exhibition of The Art of the Motorcycle in Memphis, Tennessee, U.S.A.

A Model W Sport Twin was lent by the Chandler Vintage Museum of Transportation and Wildlife to the Solomon R. Guggenheim Museum for the 1998 The Art of the Motorcycle exhibition in New York, and for the Fall 2001 Guggenheim Las Vegas show. For the Spring 2005 follow-on The Art of the Motorcycle exhibition at Wonders: The Memphis International Cultural Series, a Model W from the collection of Motorcycle Hall of Famer Bob McClean was shown.

== See also ==
- Indian Model O - an earlier American motorcycle with a similar configuration
- List of Harley-Davidson motorcycles
- List of motorcycles of the 1910s
- List of motorcycles of the 1920s
