= Excelsior Super X =

Forty-five cubic inch motorcycle

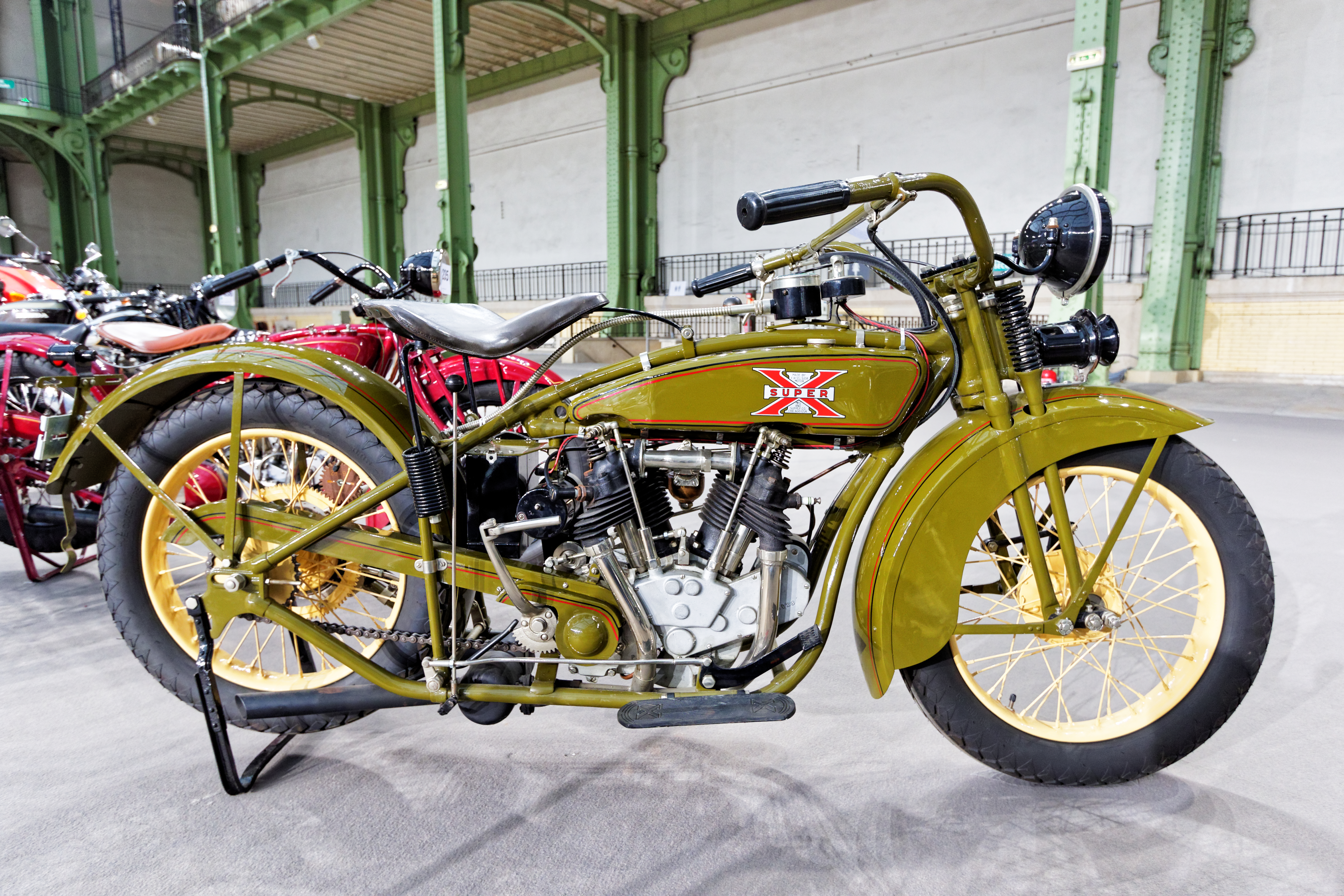
- Manufacturer: Excelsior Motor Manufacturing & Supply Company
- Parent company: Schwinn Bicycle Company
- Production: 1925-1931
- Successor: none
- Engine: air cooled IOE 746 cc (45.5 cu in) V-twin
- Transmission: 3-speed, chain
- Weight: 450 lb (204 kg) (estimated) (dry)
- Fuel capacity: 3 US gal (with a 1.2 gallon reserve)

The Excelsior Super X was a motorcycle manufactured by the Excelsior Motor Manufacturing & Supply Company from 1925 to 1931. It was the most famous Excelsior motorcycle manufactured by that company and was the first American forty-five cubic inch motorcycle.

== Origin ==
Arthur "Connie" Constantine, Assistant Chief Engineer at the Harley-Davidson Motor Company, drew up plans for a mid-sized V-Twin to compete against the Indian Scout. When he presented the unauthorized project to co-founder Walter Davidson, he was reprimanded for wasting the company's time.

Constantine resigned his position at Harley-Davidson and offered his services and his project to Excelsior. Both were accepted, leading to the introduction of the Excelsior Super X in 1925. The design proved to be competitive in motorsports in its first year despite competing against motorcycles with engines of greater capacity.

The Super X effectively replaced Excelsior's other mainstream model, a sixty-one cubic inch V-Twin, which was discontinued during the first year of Super X production. The smaller motorcycle was believed to be a more suitable companion product for their Henderson four-cylinder motorcycle.

== Construction ==
The design of the Super X was a considerable departure from its predecessors at Excelsior. Where earlier Excelsiors had an enclosed primary chain transmitting power from the engine to a separate gearbox, the Super X had the engine and transmission together in a single crankcase, using a helical gear to power the transmission directly from the engine. The Super X also marked the return of leading-link forks on Excelsior motorcycles, which had earlier switched to trailing-link forks similar to those used by Indian but with coil springs instead of Indian's quarter-elliptic leaf springs.

== Competition in the market ==
The Super X had originally been envisioned as a competitor to the Indian Scout which was, at the time, powered by a thirty-seven cubic inch V-twin engine. Indian's initial response to the Super X came in 1927, when they enlarged the Scout engine to forty-five cubic inches. This defensive move was followed a year later with a more decisive attack, the introduction of the 101 Scout. The new Scout proved to be a formidable competitor both on the racetrack and in the marketplace.

In 1929, the Excelsior-Henderson concern restyled both its motorcycle offerings, the Excelsior Super X and the Henderson Four, for a more contemporary look. These "Streamline" models had tanks that hid the top tube of the frame and wide front fenders with holes for the forks to pass through.

That year, Harley-Davidson released their forty-five cubic inch motorcycles, the D and the DL.

The Super X competed with the 101 Scout, the D, and the DL, until 1931. During 1931, the Indian 101 Scout was replaced by a Scout model based on the heavier Chief frame, the sport solo DLD was added to the D and DL in the Harley-Davidson line, and the Excelsior-Henderson concern ceased production of motorcycles upon the order of its proprietor, Ignaz Schwinn.

== Legacy ==
The Super X was America's first forty-five cubic inch motorcycle, and the racing class for forty-five cubic inch motorcycles was started in the United States one year after the Super X's introduction. The forty-five cubic inch class became the premier class in dirt-track racing, in which such motorcycles as the Indian Sport Scout and Harley-Davidson WR, KR, and XR would compete.

Although the Super X came to an abrupt end, its competitors from Indian and Harley-Davidson would continue for at least a decade.
