= Cleveland Motorcycle Manufacturing Company =

Former American motorcycle manufacturer

- Industry: Motor vehicle
- Founded: 1915
- Defunct: 1929
- Headquarters: Cleveland, Ohio, USA
- Products: Motorcycles

The Cleveland Motorcycle Manufacturing Company, sometimes called Cleveland Motorcycle, was a motorcycle manufacturer in Cleveland, Ohio, from 1902 to 1905 and again from 1915 to 1929.

== Two-stroke singles ==
In 1915 Cleveland introduced a 221 cc (13.5 cu in) displacement two-stroke single-cylinder engine with a longitudinal crankshaft orientation, necessitating a worm drive to turn the axis of rotation of the drive to the transmission by 90°. The transmission was a two speed with a sprocket turning a chain final drive. Besides driving the transmission, the engine's countershaft extended back to drive a magneto that hung in front of the rear wheel. In 1920, the motorcycle's weight increased from the addition of fenders, a larger fuel/oil tank, and in 1921 the seat was enlarged, along with a still larger fuel/oil tank, and a battery was added. The displacement was increased to 269 cc (16.4 cu in) to handle the increased weight of 195 lb (88 kg) from these changes. During World War I, US forces used the Cleveland as a base courier.

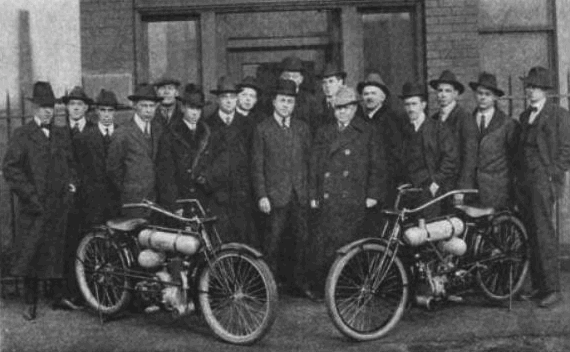
Sales, Advertising and Administration staff at a conference in March 1917.

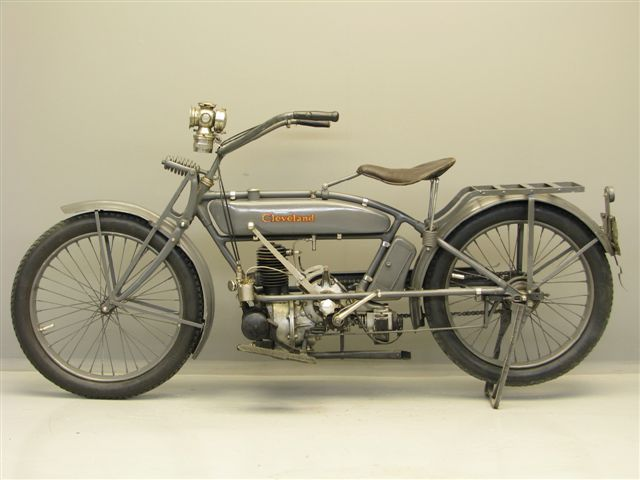
1920 Cleveland Lightweight A2 de Luxe 221 cc.

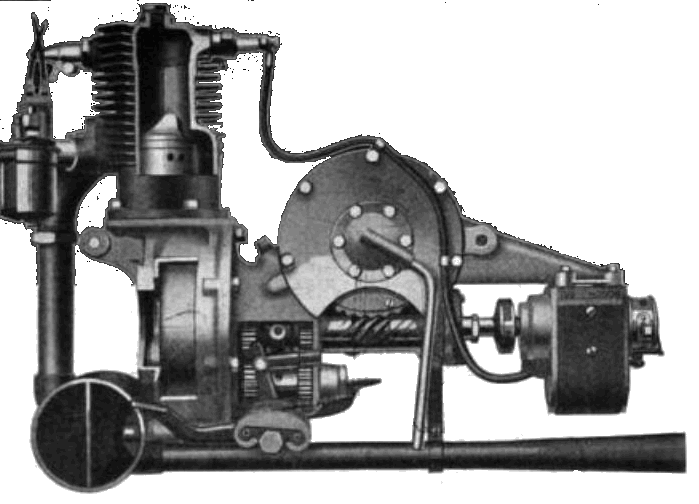
1919 cutaway diagram of the longitudinal-crankshaft, two-stroke, single-cylinder engine. The worm drive to the two-speed transmission is above the countershaft, which extends back to drive the magneto.

== Four-strokes, four cylinders, and failure ==
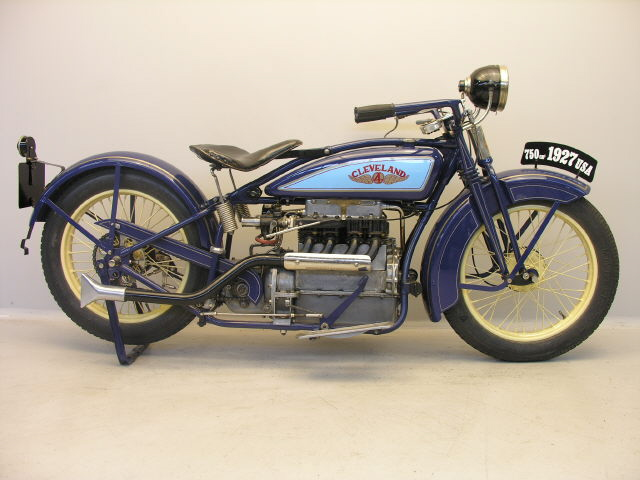
1927 Cleveland Model 4-45 1927.

In 1924, two years after buying out Reading-Standard, Cleveland replaced their two-stroke engine with a 21.5 cubic inches (352 cc) four-stroke single-cylinder engine. In 1925 they released a motorcycle with a 36.5 cubic inches (598 cc) T-head four-cylinder engine designed by L. E. Fowler. With a smaller engine than rival four-cylinder motorcycles by Henderson and Ace, Cleveland's first four-cylinder motorcycle did not sell well. In 1926, Cleveland replaced the Fowler engine with a new design by E. H. DeLong. The new engine had an inlet-over-exhaust valve configuration and a displacement of forty-five cubic inches. The displacement was increased to sixty-one cubic inches the following year.

By 1928 Cleveland had financial problems. That year, the company offered itself for sale to Harley-Davidson. Harley-Davidson considered the offer, as Cleveland's new four-cylinder motorcycles offered a ready-made competitor to Indian's Ace-based fours, but rejected it in favor of developing their own four.

In 1929 Cleveland announced their Tornado model, with a lowered frame and seat height, lightweight pistons, larger valves, and a higher compression ratio. A Century model, with a guaranteed top speed of one hundred miles per hour, was announced.

A few months after the Wall Street crash of 1929, after building only a few prototypes of the Century, Cleveland went out of business.
