= Indian Four =

Motorcycle produced from 1928 to 1942

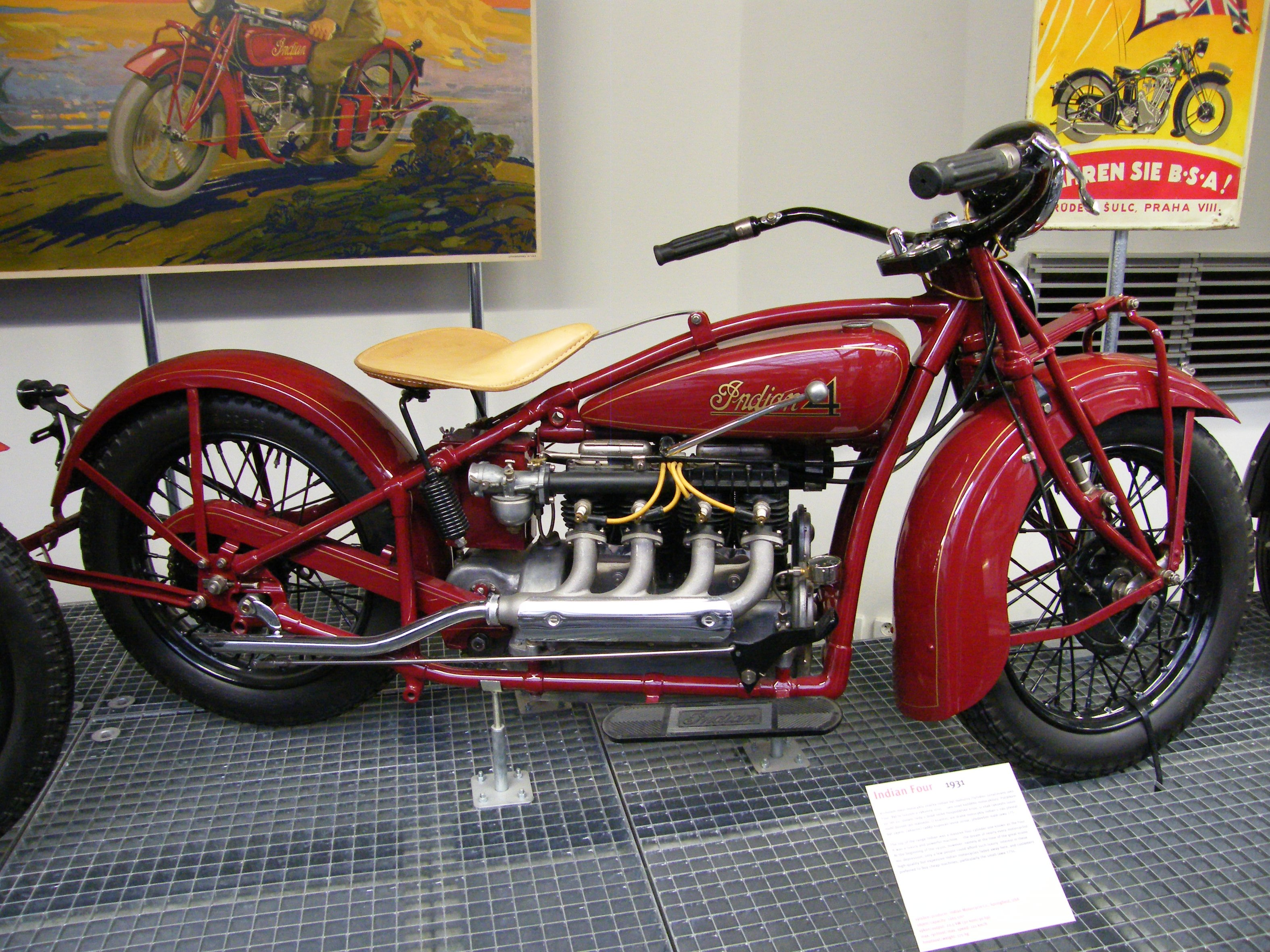
- Manufacturer: Indian Motocycle Manufacturing Company
- Production: 1928–1942
- Assembly: Springfield, Massachusetts, USA
- Class: standard / cruiser / touring
- Engine: Four-stroke inline-four engine, 77 cu. in.
- Suspension: Front: trailing link fork with leaf spring; Rear: 1922–1939: none, rigid; 1940–1942: plunger
- Brakes: Front: drum; Rear: drum
- Related: Ace motorcycle

The Indian Four was a motorcycle built by the Indian Motocycle Company from 1928 to 1942. It was based on the Ace motorcycle, which Indian bought as part of the assets of the Ace Motor Corporation in 1927.

For 1940, the Four frame was modified to include plunger rear suspension. In the same year, all Indian models were restyled with large, decorative fenders.

The Four was discontinued with the rest of civilian production in 1942 and was not returned to production after World War II ended.

== History ==
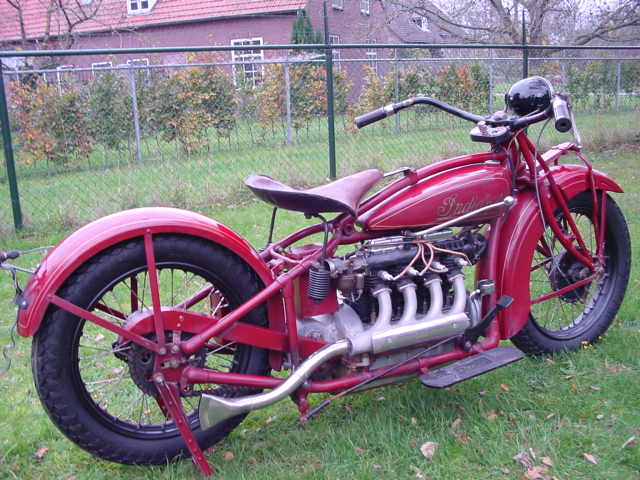
1928 Indian 402

Indian purchased the ownership of the name, rights, and production facilities of the Ace Motor Corporation in 1927. Production was moved to Springfield and the motorcycle was marketed as the Indian Ace for one year.

In 1928, the Indian Ace was replaced by the Indian 401, a development of the Ace designed by Arthur O. Lemon, former Chief Engineer at Ace, who was employed by Indian when they bought Ace. The Ace's leading-link forks and central coil spring were replaced by Indian's trailing-link forks and quarter-elliptic leaf spring.

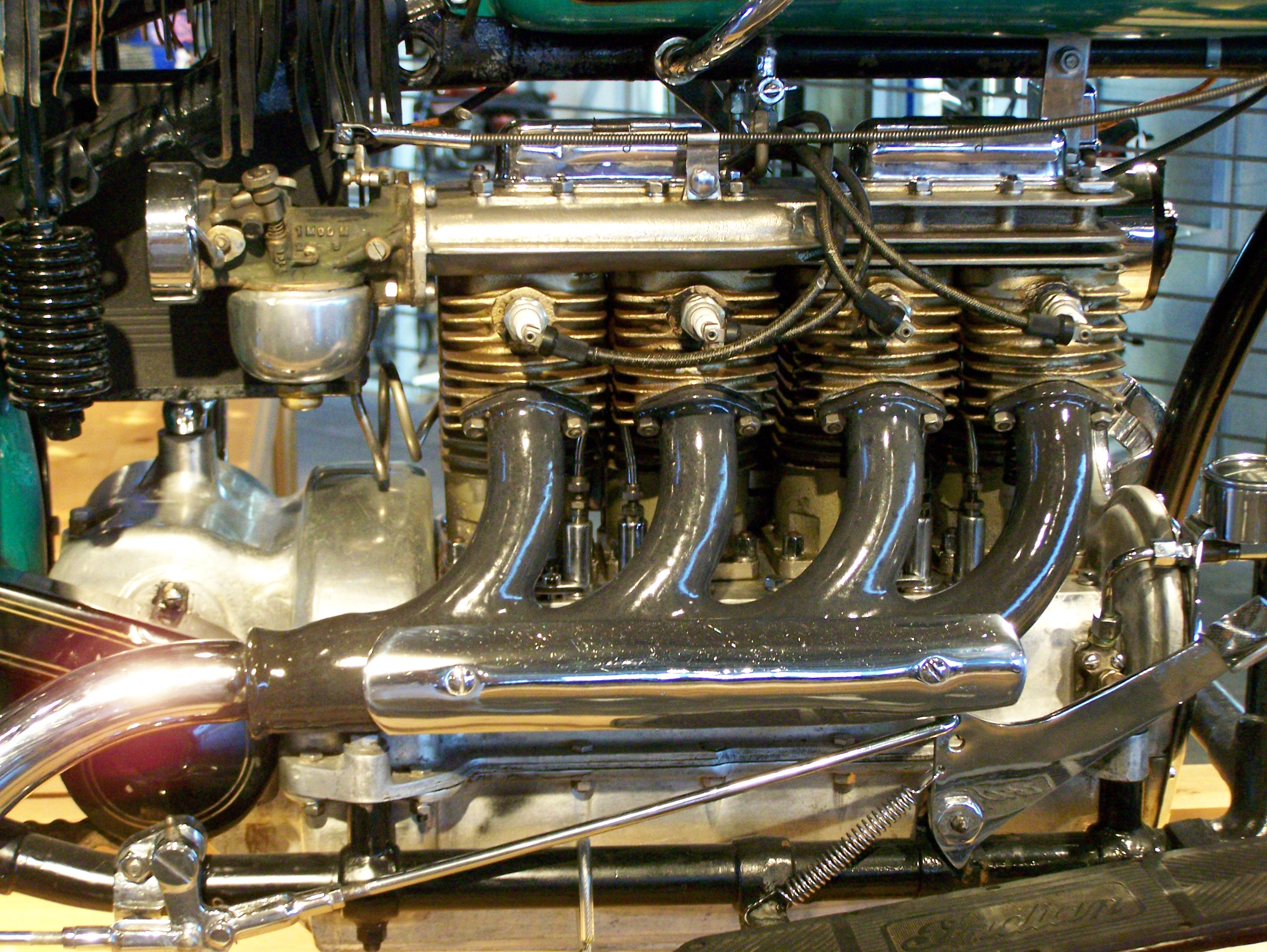
Manifold side of Indian 4 engine, showing manifolds and spark plugs at the IOE "pockets"

By 1929, the Indian 402 would have a stronger twin-downtube frame based on that of the 101 Scout and a sturdier five-bearing crankshaft than the Ace, which had a three-bearing crankshaft.

Despite the low demand for luxury motorcycles during the Great Depression, Indian not only continued production of the Four, but continued to develop the motorcycle. One of the less popular versions of the Four was the "upside down" engine on the 1936-1937 models. While earlier (and later) Fours had inlet-over-exhaust (IOE) cylinder heads with overhead inlet valves and side exhaust valves, the 1936-1937 Indian Four had a unique EOI cylinder head, with the positions reversed. In theory, this would improve fuel vaporization, and the new engine was more powerful. However, the new system made the cylinder head, and the rider's inseam, very hot. This, along with an exhaust valvetrain that required frequent adjustment, caused sales to drop. The addition of dual carburetors in 1937 did not revive interest. The design was returned to the original configuration in 1938.

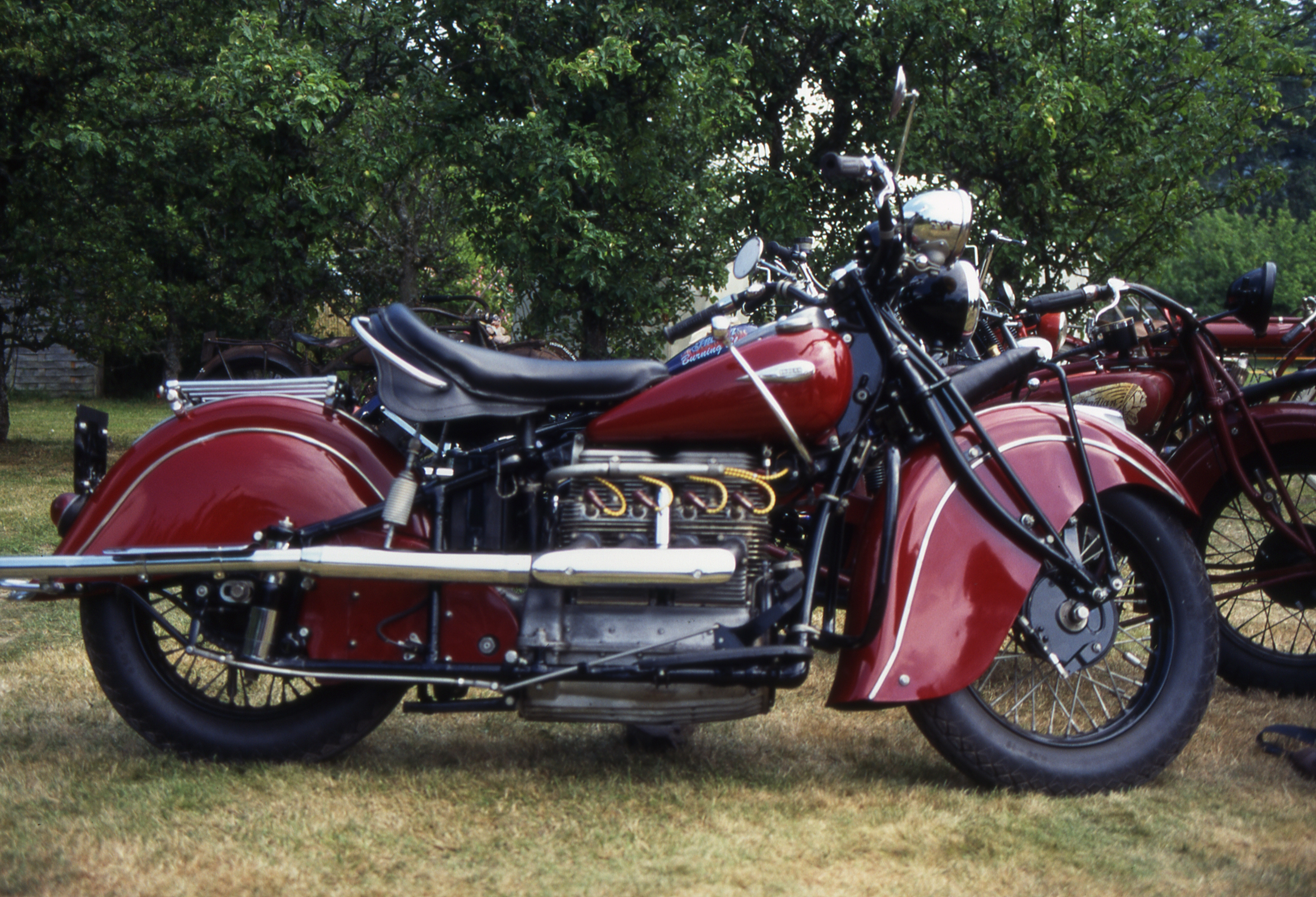
1940 Indian Four (Model 440), with plunger rear suspension and large fenders

For 1940, the Four frame was modified to include plunger rear suspension. In the same year, all Indian models were restyled with large, decorative fenders. In 1941, the 18-inch wheels of previous models were replaced with 16-inch wheels with balloon tires.

The Indian Four was discontinued in 1942.

== Legacy ==
Recognition of the historical significance of the 1940 four-cylinder model was made with an August 2006 United States Postal Service 39-cent stamp issue, part of a four panel set entitled American Motorcycles. A 1941 model is part of the Smithsonian Motorcycle Collection on display at the National Museum of American History. In 1999 as a homage to the original Indian 4, Alan Forbes a Scottish business man based in Edinburgh began production of the Indian Dakota 4. Made to order and hand built the machines have an air cooled, 2 valve, 4 cylinder engine displacing 1845cc. This was possible because Forbes held the rights to the Indian brand name in the United Kingdom. https://www.motorcyclistonline.com/dakota-four-wiking-indian-four-replica

== See also ==
- List of motorcycles by type of engine
- FN Four
- Pierce Four
- Henderson Motorcycle
