= Excelsior-Henderson Motorcycle =

1990s American motorcycle manufacturer

- Founded: 1993
- Founder: Daniel Hanlon
- Defunct: December 21, 1999
- Fate: Chapter 11 bankruptcy
- Headquarters: Belle Plaine, Minnesota
- Products: Motorcycles

Excelsior-Henderson Motorcycle was a motorcycle manufacturing company located in Belle Plaine, Minnesota, in the late 1990s that briefly produced a single model before falling into bankruptcy.

== History ==
The company was originally founded as Hanlon Manufacturing Company by Daniel Hanlon during early 1993 in Burnsville, Minnesota, United States. The company secured the rights of motorcycle names previously used by the former Excelsior-Henderson company, that was owned by Ignatz Schwinn of the Schwinn company. The company proceeded to design and manufacture proprietary motorcycles under the nameplate of the former Excelsior and Henderson motorcycles.

== Factory ==
From 1997 to 1998, the company constructed a factory in Belle Plaine, Minnesota. The factory was equipped for a capacity of 10,000 motorcycles per year, and, with a few minor assembly and finishing line changes, would have had a capacity of 20,000. After Excelsior-Henderson's closure, the factory was converted in 2009 to the headquarters of Cambria, a company specializing in quartz surfaces.

== Production ==
Excelsior-Henderson introduced its sole production model, the Super X, in December 1998, and commenced production in early 1999. The company developed the Super X motorcycle as a new proprietary motorcycle, including a new 1,386-cc, 63-hp engine, frame, and all related drive and styling components, adopting styling cues from earlier motorcycles, such as a leading-link fork and a row of three headlights. The company established 140 dealers throughout the United States. The motorcycles averaged an MSRP around $18,500. Via the assembly line, the company produced for retail sale approximately 1,900 motorcycles in various configurations; 1161 units in model year 1999, and 720 units in model year 2000. In total, the company produced an estimated 1,950 motorcycles, including motorcycles produced and not designed for retail dealer sales, such as dealer promotional bikes, test prototypes, and non–mass-produced motorcycles.

== Chapter 11 bankruptcy ==
Excelsior-Henderson, having spent $100 million in capital over a seven-year period and still several years from profitability, was unable to raise additional capital by late 1999. Therefore, on December 21, 1999, Excelsior-Henderson filed for reorganization under Chapter 11, Title 11, United States Code. As an outcome of the process, certain assets of the company were sold to a Florida investment group, which later filed for reorganization and no longer exists. Production of motorcycles never recommenced. According to former employees, the company's failures can be attributed to ineptitude in growing a dealer network, micromanaging, and an unwillingness to accept and incorporate suggested improvements. Gary Fields, Deputy Commissioner of Minnesota's Department of Trade and Economic Development, said that the state would be less likely to fund another startup because of the failure of Excelsior-Henderson.

== Post-bankruptcy status ==
In December 2020, Cycle World reported that Excelsior-Henderson's intellectual property had been purchased by Bajaj Group, a major manufacturer of motorcycles in India.
