= List of motorcycles in the Smithsonian Institution =

Make & Model	Displacement	Year	Country	Exhibit
Roper steam velocipede	n/a	1869	United States	America on the Move at National Museum of American History
Clarke gasoline tricycle		1897	United States	America on the Move
Curtiss V-8	269 cu in (4,410 cc)	1907	United States	Smithsonian National Air and Space Museum
Harley-Davidson model 9B	35 cu in (570 cc)	1913	United States	America on the Move
Pope Model L	61 cu in (1,000 cc)	1913	United States	America on the Move
Autoped motor scooter	155 cc (9.5 cu in)	1918	United States	America on the Move
Cleveland	13.5 cu in (221 cc)	1918	United States	America on the Move
Indian Single		1918	United States	America on the Move
Simplex Servi-Cycle	7.9 cu in (129 cc)	1935	United States	America on the Move
Indian Four	77 cu in (1,260 cc)	1941	United States	America on the Move
Harley-Davidson Model 74	74 cu in (1,210 cc)	1942	United States	America on the Move
Cushman scooter		1945	United States	America on the Move
Evel Knievel's Harley-Davidson XR-750	750 cc (46 cu in)	1972	United States	America on the Move
Kawasaki model KZ900 Police Special	900 cc (55 cu in)	1976	United States	America on the Move
Yamaha SR185 with Rifle fairing	185 cc (11.3 cu in)	1982	Japan/U.S.	America on the Move
Harley-Davidson Electra Glide Ultra Classic	80 cu in (1,300 cc)	1993	United States	America on the Move
Robert M. Pirsig's Honda CB77 Super Hawk	305 cc (18.6 cu in)	1966	Japan	Not exhibited. Donated to National Museum of American History December, 2019
