= Barnard (cyclecar) =

The Barnard was a British cyclecar manufactured by A Ward of Whitechapel Road, London, between 1921 and 1922.

Two versions of the car were produced and advertised – a touring and a sports model. They were both powered by an 1169 cc straight four air-cooled motorcycle engine by the American Henderson motorcycle company. The gearbox had three forward speeds and no reverse coupled to the engine through a multi-plate clutch in an oil bath. Drive to the rear axle was by chain. The engine was started by a kick starter.

The cyclecar body featured a dummy bullnose radiator and side-by-side twin seats. The sports model had a full-length exhaust running the length of the outside of the car on the driver's side, as well as twin spare wheels mounted on top of the tail. The Tourer model cost £168 and the Sports model £188.

== See also ==
- List of car manufacturers of the United Kingdom
