= Schwinn Racer =

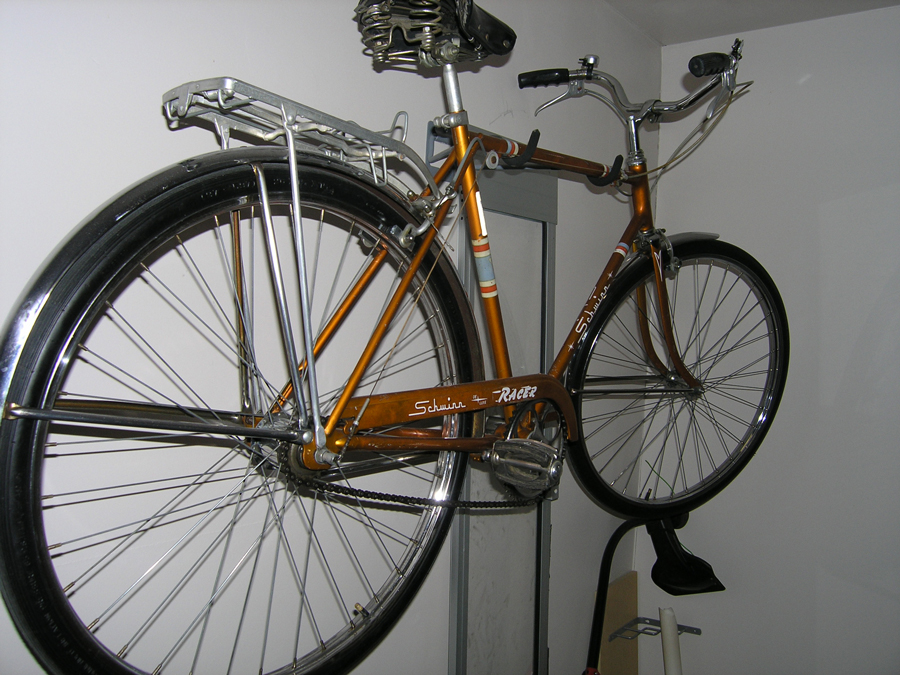
1966 Schwinn Racer Deluxe in coppertone

The Schwinn Racer was a bicycle in the lightweight series of bikes built by Schwinn Bicycle Company in Chicago from 1933 to 1971. They had a Sturmey Archer 3 speed with 26 x 1 3/8 tires as well as the occasional 24x1 3/8. They were sold with both S5 (Deluxe Racer) and S6 (Standard Racer) designated rims. They also came with single speed coaster brakes, some early Racers were equipped with a Bendix 2 speed manual and several model years could be had with 2 speed kickbacks.

The Schwinn catalog will give the best idea of the options that could be had. The options vary quite a bit from year to year including the paint colors. Standard Racers sported the wing badge through 1964 and Deluxe Racers sported that badge through 1966. Racers built between 1957 and 1963 will have the "shark fin" front fender as did all of the lightweight offerings. These fenders were discontinued due to safety concerns and were replaced by the traditional lightweight fenders for the 1964 model year. Many were accessorized with speedometers, generators, baskets and rear racks. These parts were made for Schwinn by a variety of manufacturers and installed by the selling dealer. As the ten-speed road bikes with derailleurs became more fashionable, the Racer was also offered as a 10 speed before being ultimately discontinued. The Racer was virtually identical in every way to the Speedster, however, many of the lightweight Speedsters sported Camelback frames where the Racer almost always retained its traditional diamond frame. The Racer name made a reappearance after World War II. Before the war it was also offered as a singlespeed track bike with an imported half inch pitch drive from Europe that sported a freewheel.
