= IOE engine =

Type of combustion engines

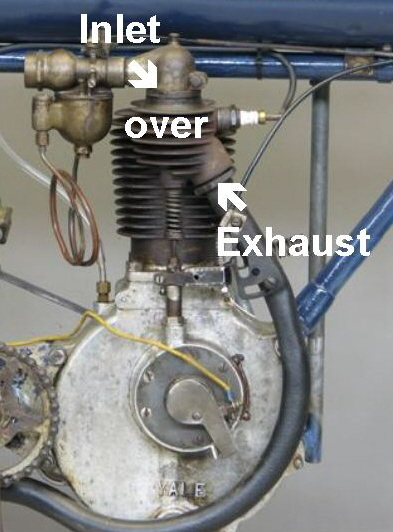
Yale IOE engine from 1911

The intake/inlet over exhaust, or "IOE" engine, known in the US as F-head, is a four-stroke internal combustion engine whose valvetrain comprises OHV inlet valves within the cylinder head and exhaust side-valves within the engine block.

IOE engines were widely used in early motorcycles, initially with the inlet valve being operated by engine suction instead of a cam-activated valvetrain. When the suction-operated inlet valves reached their limits as engine speeds increased, the manufacturers modified the designs by adding a mechanical valvetrain for the inlet valve. A few automobile manufacturers, including Willys, Rolls-Royce and Humber also made IOE engines for both cars and military vehicles. Rover manufactured inline four and six cylinder engines with a particularly efficient version of the IOE induction system.

A few designs with the reverse system, exhaust over inlet (EOI), have been manufactured, such as the Ford Quadricycle of 1896.

== Description ==
In a F-head/IOE engine, the intake manifold and its valves are located in the cylinder head above the cylinders, and are operated by rocker arms which reverse the motion of the pushrods so that the intake valves open downward into the combustion chamber. The exhaust manifold and its valves are located beside or as part of the cylinders, in the block. The exhaust valves are either roughly or exactly parallel with the pistons; their faces point upwards and they are not operated by separate pushrods, but by contact with a camshaft through the tappet or valve lifter and an integrated valve stem/pushrod. The valves were offset to one side, forming what seemed to be a pocket, leading to the term "pocket valve" being used for IOE engines. An F-head engine combines features from both overhead-valve and flathead type engines, the inlet valve operating via pushrod and rocker arm and opening downward like an overhead valve engine, while the exhaust valve is offset from the cylinder and opens upward via an integrated pushrod/valve stem directly actuated by the camshaft, much like the valves in a flathead engine.

== Origin ==
The earliest IOE layouts used atmospheric inlet valves which were held closed with a weak spring and were opened by the pressure differential created when the piston went down on the inlet stroke. This worked well with low-speed early engines and had the benefit of being very simple and cheap, but the weak spring was unable to close the valve fast enough as engine speed increased. This required stronger springs, which in turn required direct mechanical action to open, as the atmospheric pressure of 15 PSI limits the total force available from creating a pressure differential, meaning that a 15 pounds (6.8 kg) spring is theoretical limit while for practical purposes, lighter springs were typically used. When the limits of this system were reached, the design was improved without substantial changes to the head casting by adding a mechanical system to open the inlet valves and stronger springs to close them. In both cases, the exhaust valves were in the block and were opened by contact with a camshaft through a tappet or valve lifter and closed by springs.

== Advantages and disadvantages ==
The IOE design allows the use of larger valves than a sidevalve (or L-head) or overhead valve engine. Its advantages over the sidevalve/flathead also include a compact combustion chamber, a well-located spark plug, and a cooling effect from the mixture swirl, along with better intake mixture flow. Disadvantages include a combustion chamber of more complex shape than that of an overhead valve engine, which affects combustion rates and can create hot spots in the piston head, and inferior valve location, which hinders efficient scavenging. Due to the added complications of rocker arms and pushrods, it is also more complex and expensive to make than a sidevalve engine, as well as being physically larger due to the rocker arms being placed over the cylinder head, and it requires an inlet valve and ports in the cylinder head, while the cylinder of a sidevalve engine is simply a closed-end cylinder.

== Coventry Climax IOE engines ==
F Type At the Olympia Motor Show in 1923, Coventry Climax listed four F-type 4-cylinder water cooled engines.[13] All had 100 mm stroke, and the bores were 59 (1,094 cc displacement), 63 (1,247 cc), 66 (1,368 cc) and 69 mm (1,496 cc). The GWK car had featured in Coventry Climax adverts from late 1920 with a Coventry Climax 10.8 hp 4-cylinder engine, the same horsepower rating as the 66 mm bore F type.[14] The engines were available either separate or in unit construction with a three speed gearbox.[15]

OC

Type OC engine in a Crossley 10 hp At first, the OC was made with a capacity of 1,122 cc as a straight-four using a bore of 63 mm and stroke of 90 mm with overhead inlet and side exhaust valves, producing 34 bhp (25 kW). It was introduced in the early 1930s and also built under licence by Triumph.

MC The OC engine had morphed into the MC engine by 1933. It looked virtually identical, but there were internal differences. It was still 1,122 cc, I.O.E., and four cylinders inline, but the camshaft was different, as were the cam followers. The timing marks on the flywheel are now observed from the top of the engine rather than the underside as on the OC. Carburation varied, from the side draught Solex, the down draught SU, to the progressive choke down draught and then a larger side draught SU system on Triumph engines. The engine was water-cooled by thermosyphon with no water pump or fan.

JM A six-cylinder version of the MC engine, the JM, was made with a capacity of 1,476 cc with a 59 mm bore, developing 42 bhp (31 kW). The JMC version had its capacity increased to 1,683 cc by increasing the bore to 63 mm and produced 48 bhp (36 kW). It was different from the 4 cylinder engine in that it had both a water pump and an oil filter, whereas the 4 cylinder engine relied on thermosyphon alone and no oil filter.

== Rover IOE engines ==
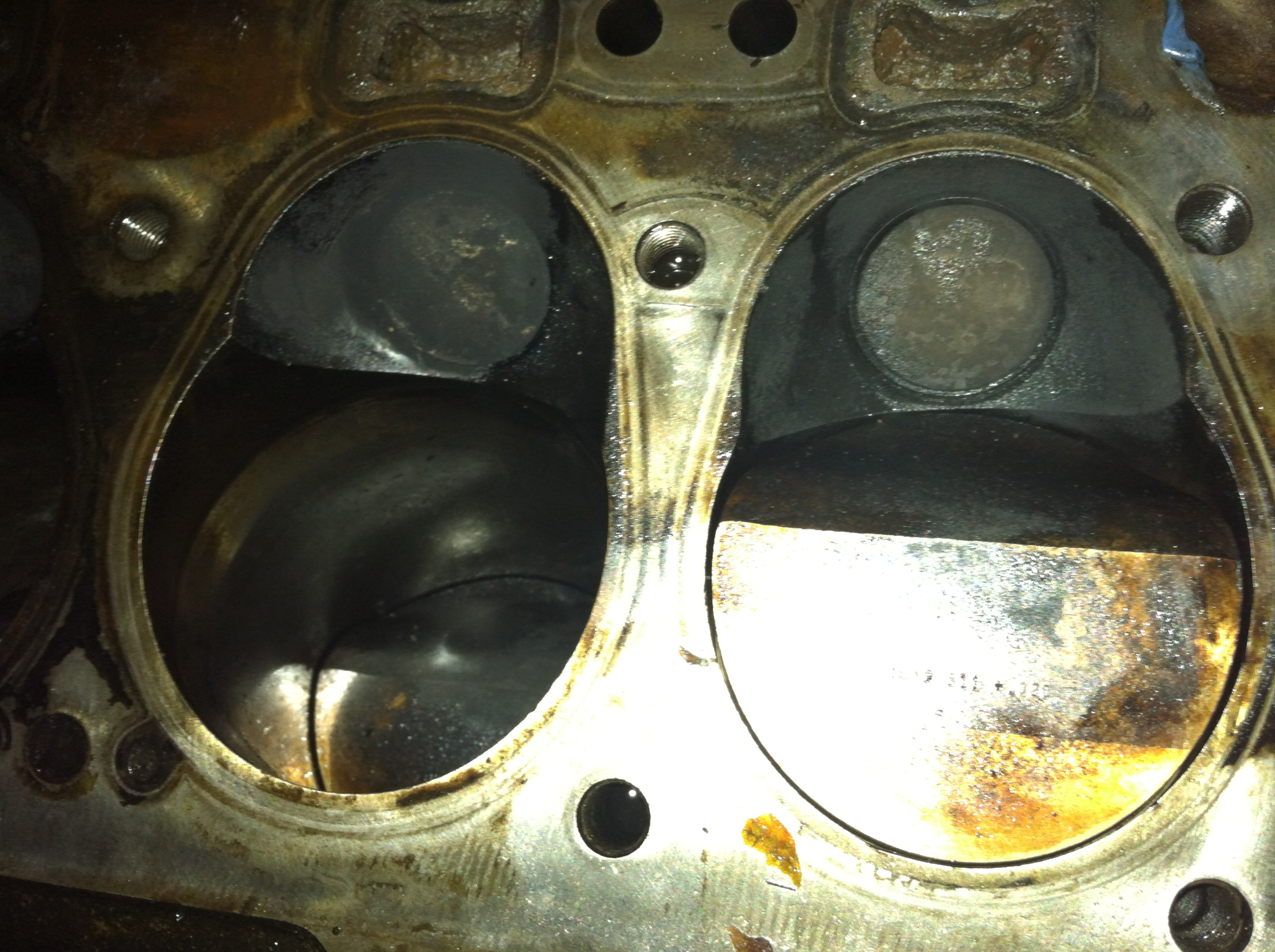
Closeup of two cylinders in a three-litre Rover IOE Engine with the combustion chamber, angled piston top, and exhaust valve visible

Rover used a more advanced form of IOE engine. It was designed by Jack Swaine in the mid-late 1940s and was in production from 1948 to the early 1990s. Unlike the conventional F-head IOE, this had an efficient combustion chamber designed for good combustion, rather than simple manufacture. The top surface of the block was machined at an angle, with the piston crowns angled in a "pitched roof" to match. At TDC, the piston almost touched the angled inlet valve and provided good 'squish' to the combustion chamber itself, offset to the side by half a cylinder diameter. The resultant combustion chamber shape was a near-ideal hemisphere, although inverted and tilted from the usual "hemi-head" design. The spark plug was centrally mounted and this, together with the turbulence generated by the squish, provided a short flame path. The thinness of the gas layer between piston and inlet valve was so confined as to reduce the risk of detonation on poor fuel, one factor that kept it in service with Land Rover for so long. During the late 1940s and early 1950s when the only petrol available was low octane 'pool' petrol it also allowed Rover to run higher compression ratios than many competitors with the more usual side- or overhead valve designs.

The unusual combustion chamber arrangement with its angled valves also led to an unusual valve train. The block-mounted camshaft operates small wedge shaped rockers, one for each valve. In early models the camshaft acts on a simple pad on the rocker, but for later models this pad was replaced by a roller follower. The exhaust rockers act directly on the valves, whilst the inlet rockers act on pushrods running up to a second set of longer flat rockers operating the inlet valves. The Rover engine, like many 1940s and earlier British designs, was a small bore, long stroke (undersquare) engine to keep the RAC tax horsepower rating as low as possible, thus keeping the road tax as low as possible. The IOE layout enabled Rover to use larger valves than would normally be possible in a small bore engine, allowing better breathing and better performance.

The Rover IOE engine family encompassed straight-4 (1.6- and 2.0-litres) and straight-6 (2.1-, 2.2-, 2.3-, 2.4-, 2.6- and 3.0-litres) engines and powered much of the company's post-war range in the form of the P3, P4 and P5 models. Adapted versions of the 1.6 and 2.0 IOE engines were used in early version of the Land Rover as well. Power outputs ranged from 50bhp (Land Rover 1.6) to 134bhp (P5 3 litre MkII & III). The 2.6 6-cylinder IOE engine had a particularly long career. After being used in Rover P4 saloon cars it was added to long-wheelbase Land Rover models from 1963 in the 2A Forward Control models, then in 1967 in the bonneted 109", and remained an optional fitment until 1980 when it was replaced by the Rover V8.

=== Similar Packard cylinder head ===
The shape of the combustion chamber as an "inverted hemi-head", along with the angled cylinder head joint and pitched-roof piston crowns, had earlier been used in the 1930 Van Ranst-designed Packard V12 engine, although in this case the valves were both in the block as side valves and the spark plug was poorly placed at the extremity of the combustion chamber.

== Other users ==
Motorcycles

The IOE valvetrain layout was used extensively in early American motorcycles, mainly based on a French design by De Dion-Bouton. Harley-Davidson used IOE engines with atmospheric inlet valves until 1912, and with mechanically driven inlet valves from 1911 to 1929. Indian used IOE valvetrains on all of their four-cylinder bikes except those built in 1936 and 1937. Other American motorcycle manufacturers that used IOE engines included Excelsior, Henderson, and Ace.

Automobiles

Hudson used an IOE inline-four engine in its Essex line of cars from 1919 to 1923 and an IOE straight-six engine in its Hudson line of cars from 1927 to 1929.

In Europe in the same period Humber Limited of Coventry, England produced a full range of cars using IOE engines, these were however phased out at the end of the 1920s in favour of models using cheaper L head engines shared with Hillman

Post WW2 Willys, and its successor Kaiser-Jeep, used variants of the Willys Hurricane engine from 1950 to 1971.

Rolls-Royce used an IOE straight-six engine originally designed immediately prior to WW2 in their post-war Silver Wraith. From this engine Rolls-Royce derived the B series engines for British Army combat vehicles which were produced in four, six and eight cylinder versions (the B40, B60 and B80) by Rolls-Royce (and in the case of the B40 used in the Austin Champ by Morris Motors) for military vehicles, fire appliances and even buses. A more advanced shorter stroke passenger car development the FB60 engine, a straight-six IOE engine displacing 3909cc and producing a claimed 175 , was used by BMC in the Vanden Plas Princess 4-litre R saloon car. Over 6000 of these cars were made.

== Exhaust over intake (EOI) ==
Some engines have been made with the reverse configuration, having the exhaust valve located in the cylinder head and the intake valve in the block. The ABC Skootamota began production with an engine of this configuration, but this was changed to an overhead valve engine before production ended.

In 1936 and 1937, the Indian Four had the valve positions reversed, with the exhaust valve in the head and the inlet valve in the block. In theory, this would improve fuel vaporization, and the engine was actually more powerful. However, the new system made the cylinder head very hot. The exhaust valve linkage required frequent adjustment. The design returned to the original IOE configuration in 1938.

== See also ==
- Harley-Davidson engine timeline
