= Ace Motor Corporation =

Defunct American motorcycle manufacturer

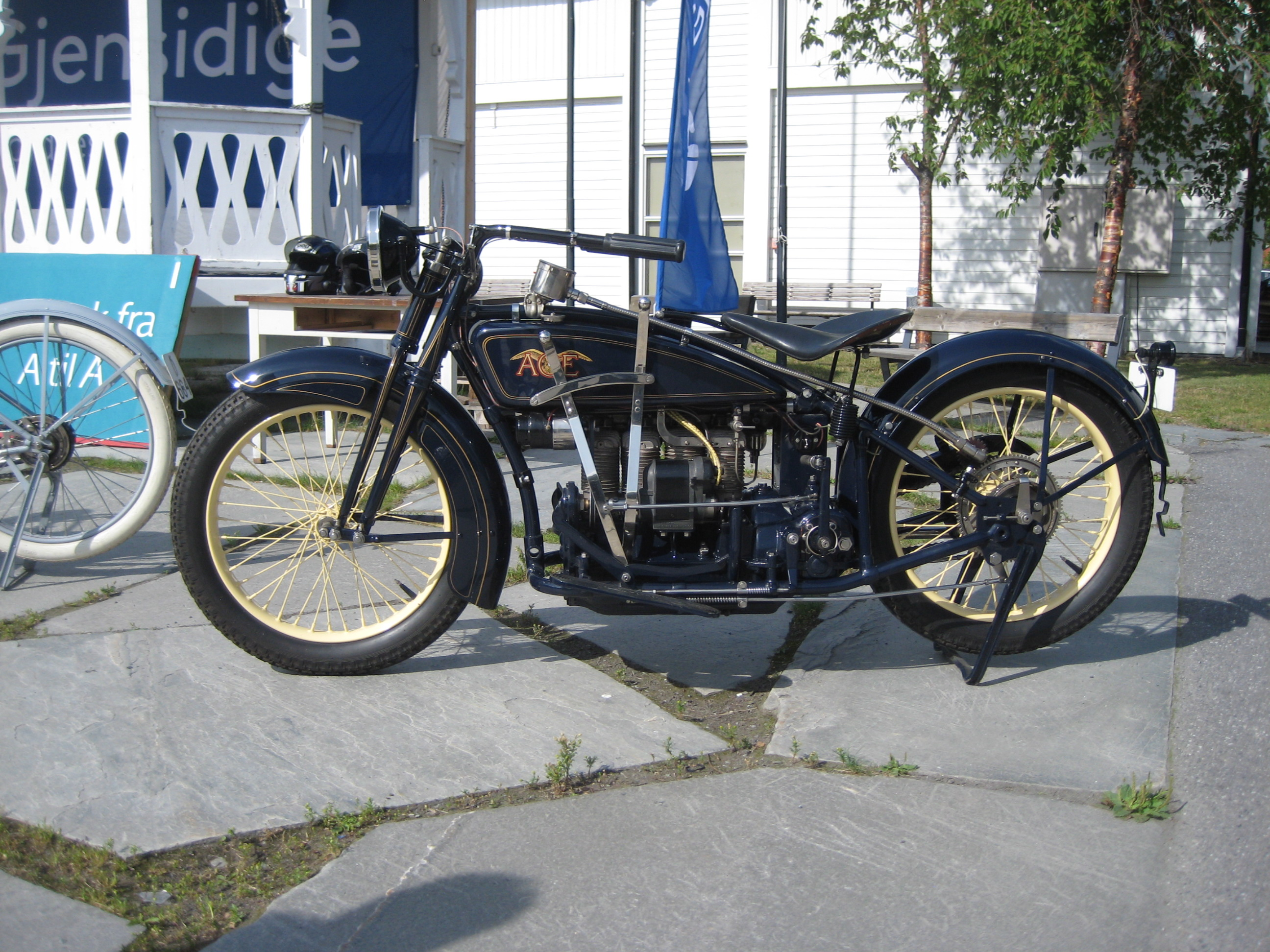
Ace Motorcycle, 1923

Ace Motor Corporation was a motorcycle manufacturer in continuous operation in Philadelphia, Pennsylvania between 1919 and 1924, and intermittently afterward until 1927. Essentially only one model of the large luxury four-cylinder motorcycle, with slight variations, was made from first to last.

== History ==
=== Origin ===
The original company was legally incorporated as the Ace Motor Corporation in Philadelphia in 1919. It was founded by William G. Henderson, who resigned from Excelsior Motor Manufacturing & Supply Co. (after having sold the earlier Henderson Motorcycle business) that same year. He founded the company in the fall of 1919, backed by Max M. Sladkin of Haverford Cycle Co., to build his own inline four-cylinder motorcycle design.

Having sold Henderson Motorcycle to Ignaz Schwinn's Excelsior Motor Manufacturing & Supply Company, founder William G. Henderson continued to work there until 1919, when differences of opinion regarding the design direction of Henderson motorcycles led to his resignation from Excelsior.

In the fall of 1919, with the support of Max M. Sladkin of Haverford Cycle Co., Henderson started the Ace Motor Corporation in Philadelphia, Pennsylvania. The Ace motorcycle resembled the Henderson in general form, being a longitudinal four-cylinder motorcycle with chain drive, but Henderson had to be careful not to infringe any trademarks or patents that would have been owned by Excelsior at the time. Production began in 1920.

=== Death of William Henderson ===
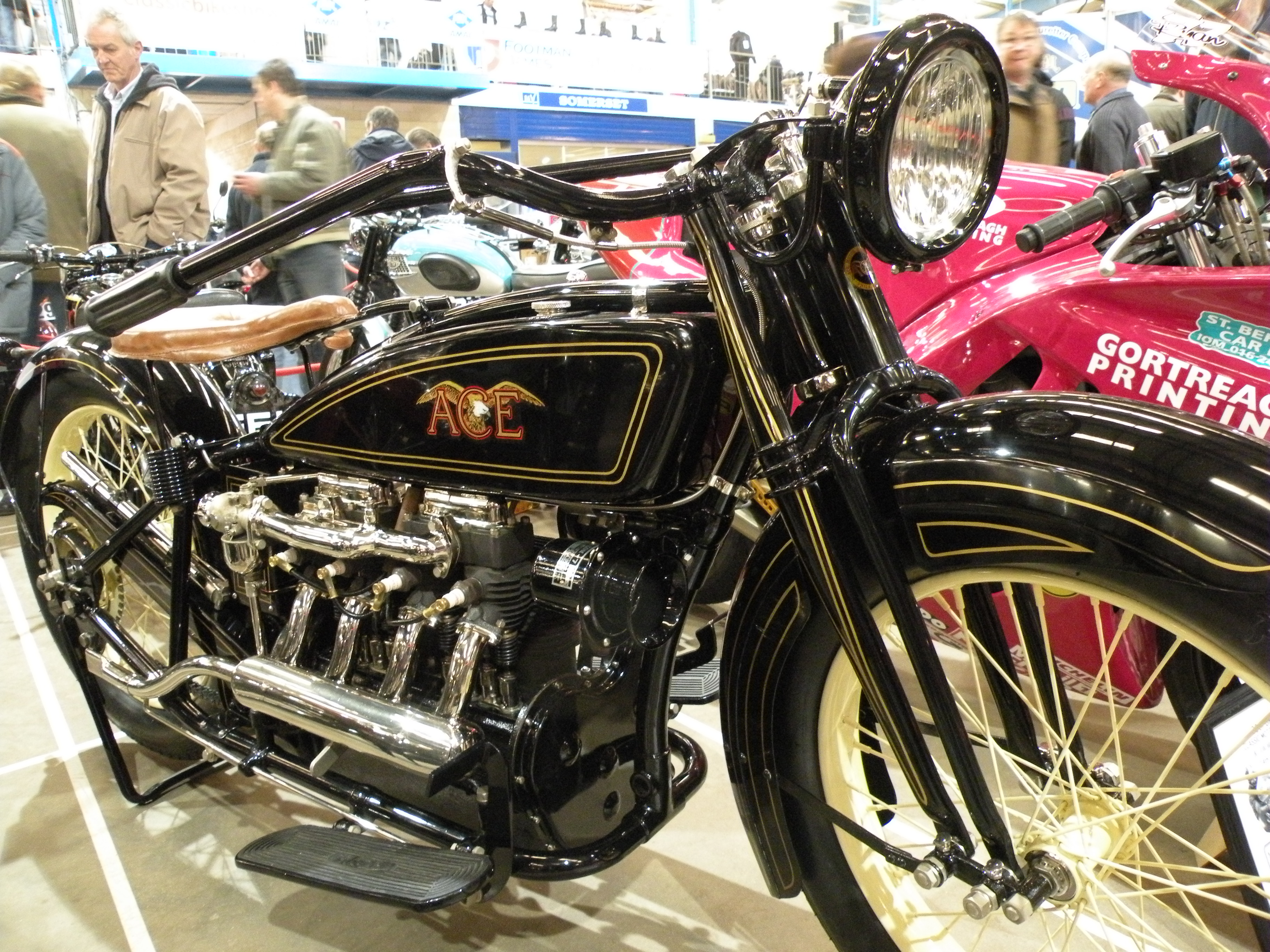
1922 Ace motorcycle

On December 11, 1922, shortly after 11 a.m., William Henderson was hit by a motor vehicle while testing the new Ace Sporting Solo in Philadelphia. He died at the age of 39 in Frankford Hospital without regaining consciousness.

Arthur O. Lemon, former Henderson salesman and head of Excelsior and Henderson engineering at Excelsior Motor Manufacturing & Supply, left Excelsior in 1923 to replace Henderson as Chief Engineer at Ace.

=== Ownership ===
Ace Motor Corporation ceased operation in 1924. In the next two years, ownership of Ace's name, rights, and production facilities would change hands several times.

=== Indian Ace ===
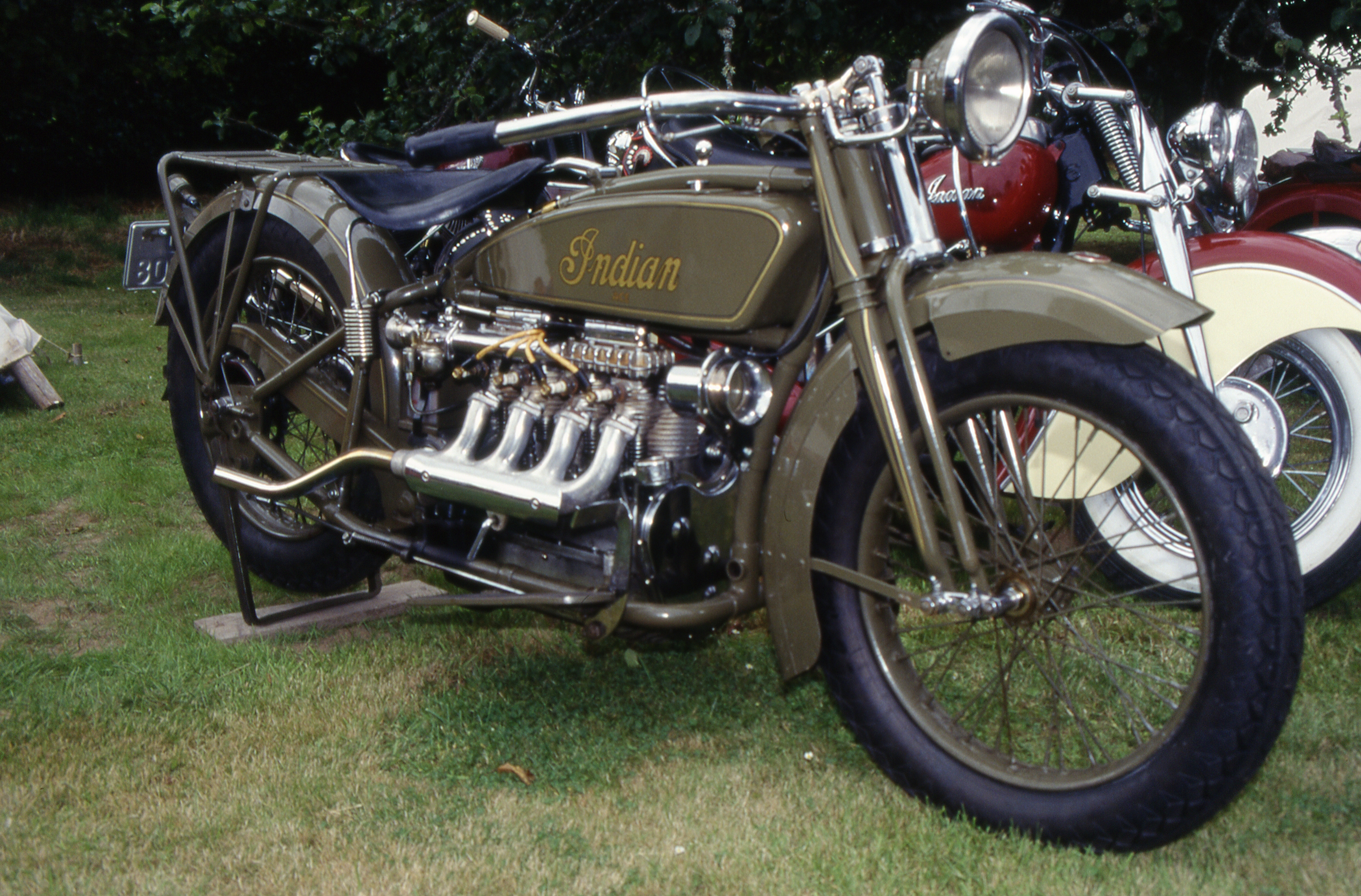
1928 Indian Ace, with leading-link forks and a large central coil spring. Later Indian Fours would feature Indian-style trailing-link forks with leaf springs.

The property of Ace Motor changed hands for the last time in 1927, when it was purchased by the Indian Motocycle Company. Production was moved to Springfield, Massachusetts, and the motorcycle was marketed as the Indian Ace for one year. Once the designs began to be modified within Indian, the Ace name was discontinued.

Production of four-cylinder Indian motorcycles would continue until 1942.

== Ace Speed Trophy ==
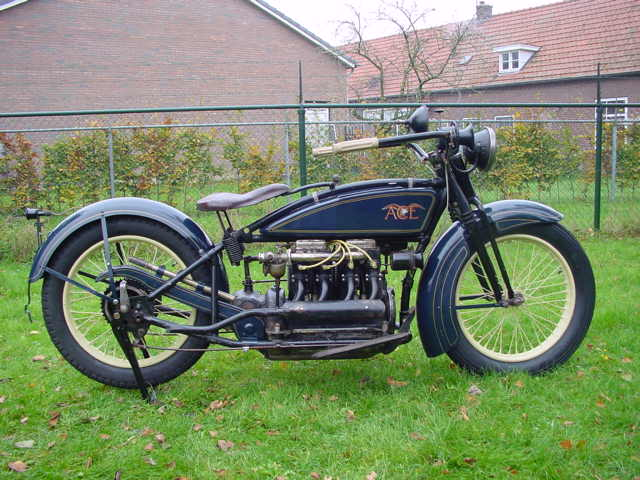
ACE Motorcycle

In 1923, Red Wolverton rode a specially prepared Ace XP-4 at a record speed of 129 mph (208 km/h). The management of Ace Motor Corporation offered the Ace Speed Trophy and a cash prize to anyone who could break the XP-4's record. Neither the trophy nor the prize was ever claimed.

== See also ==
- List of motorcycles of the 1920s
