= Excelsior Motor Manufacturing & Supply Company =

Former American motorcycle manufacturer in Chicago

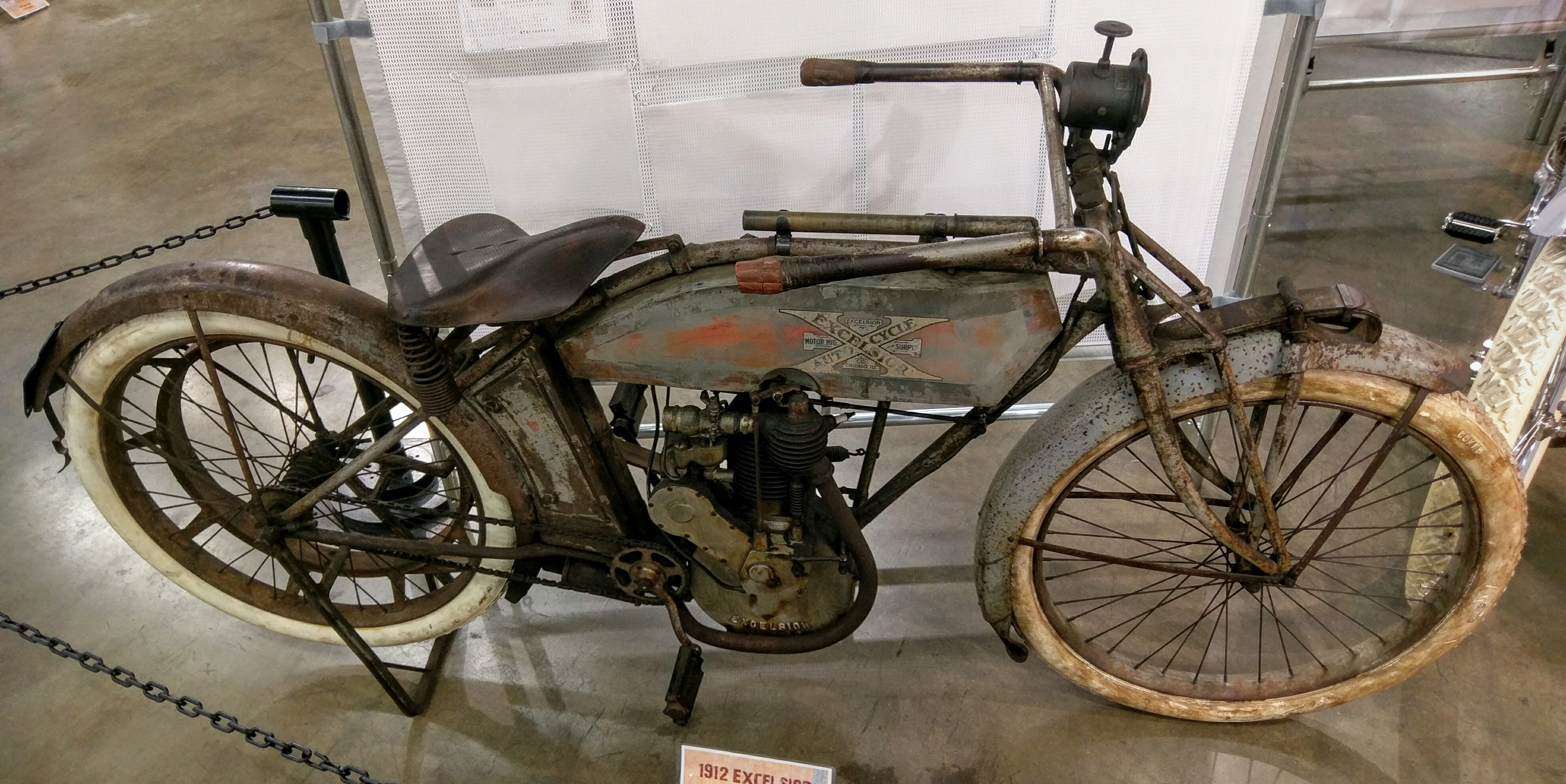
1912 Excelsior motorcycle on display at the California Automobile Museum

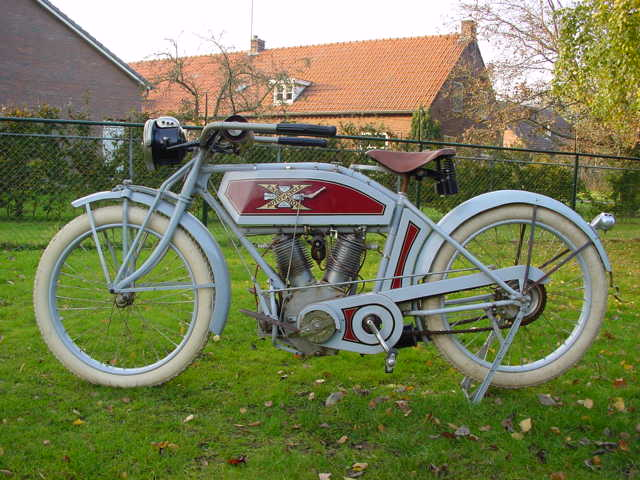
1914 Excelsior

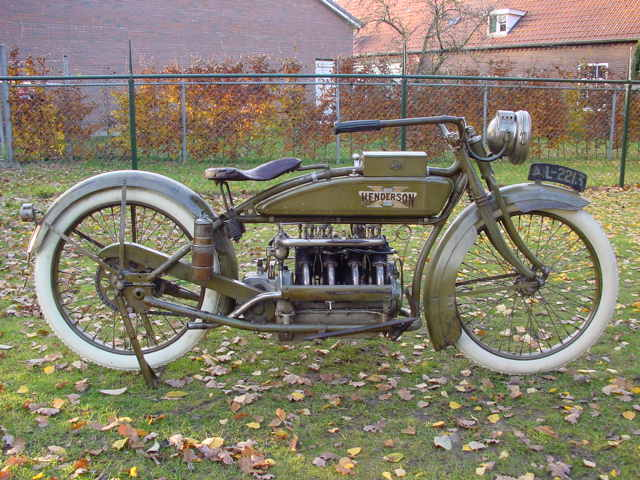
1918 Henderson built by Excelsior

Excelsior Motor Manufacturing & Supply Company was an American motorcycle manufacturer operating in Chicago from 1907 to 1931. It was purchased by Ignaz Schwinn, proprietor of bicycle manufacturer Arnold, Schwinn & Co. in 1912. In 1912, an Excelsior was the first motorcycle to be officially timed at a speed of 100 mph. The Henderson Motorcycle Company became a division of Excelsior when Schwinn purchased Henderson in 1917. By 1928, Excelsior was in third place in the U.S. motorcycle market behind Indian and Harley-Davidson. The Great Depression convinced Schwinn to order Excelsior's operations to cease in September 1931.

== Excelsior BigX ==
The mainstay of Excelsior production through the 1910s and into the 1920s was the 61 cu in (1,000 cc) Model BigX. This had an inlet-over-exhaust v-twin engine, first with belt drive then with 2 speed and then 3 speed gearbox. Colors were grey with red panels in the early teens, the 'Military Model' of the late teens was in khaki (a green-brown shade) and 1920s models were in a very dark blue with fine gold pinstriping. Many were exported, Europe and Australia receiving a number of shipments. A very small number of BigX motorcycles were manufactured with 74 cu in (1,210 cc) engines in the 1920s. Production of the BigX continued until 1924, when it was replaced by the Super X.

== Excelsior Super X ==
Excelsior released its Super X model in 1925. The Super X was America's first motorcycle with a 45 cu in (737 cc) V-twin engine. The Super X was conceived as a competitor to the smaller Indian Scout. In response to the Super X's popularity, Indian first raised the Scout's capacity to 45 cubic inches (737 cc) and then introduced the new Indian 101 Scout, while Harley-Davidson introduced their 45 cu in (737 cc) motorcycle, the Model D.

== End of production ==
In 1929, the stock market crash and the resulting Great Depression caused motorcycle sales to plummet. The summer of 1931 saw Schwinn call his department heads together for a meeting at Excelsior. He bluntly told them, with no prior indication, "Gentlemen, today we stop." Schwinn felt that the Depression could easily continue for eight years, and even worsen. Despite a full order book, he had chosen to pare back his business commitments to the core business of bicycle manufacture. All motorcycle operations at Excelsior ended by September 1931.

== See also ==
- List of motorcycles of the 1910s
- List of motorcycles of the 1920s
- List of motorcycles of the 1930s
- Henderson Motorcycle
