= Schwinn Bicycle Company =

American bicycle company

- 2021 Schwinn logo
- Type: Subsidiary
- Founded: July 14, 1895; 131 years ago
- Founder: Ignaz Schwinn
- Headquarters: Vancouver, Washington, U.S.
- Key people: Edward Schwinn (president)
- Parent: Pon Holdings (Pacific Cycle)
- Website: schwinnbikes.com

The Schwinn Bicycle Company is an American bicycle company headquartered in Vancouver, Washington. The company was founded by Ignaz Schwinn (1860–1948) in Chicago in 1895, and in the 20th century became the dominant manufacturer of American bicycles.

Schwinn first declared bankruptcy in 1992 and was restructured. In 2001 Schwinn again declared bankruptcy and was purchased by Pacific Cycle, now owned by the Dutch conglomerate, Pon Holdings.

== History ==
The classic Schwinn headbadge

=== Founding of Schwinn ===
Ignaz Schwinn was born in Hardheim, Baden, Germany, in 1860 and worked on two-wheeled ancestors of the modern bicycle that appeared in 19th century Europe. Schwinn emigrated to the United States in 1891. In 1895, with the financial backing of fellow German American Adolph Frederick William Arnold (a meat packer), he founded Arnold, Schwinn & Company. Schwinn's new company coincided with a sudden bicycle craze in America. Chicago became the center of the American bicycle industry, with thirty factories turning out thousands of bikes every day. Bicycle output in the United States grew to over a million units per year by the turn of the 20th century.

The boom in bicycle sales was short-lived, saturating the market years before motor vehicles were common on American streets. By 1905, bicycle annual sales had fallen to only 25% of that reached in 1900. Many smaller companies were absorbed by larger firms or went bankrupt; in Chicago, only twelve bicycle makers remained in business. Competition became intense, both for parts suppliers and for contracts from the major department stores, which retailed the majority of bicycles produced in those days. Realizing he needed to grow the company, Ignaz Schwinn purchased several smaller bicycle firms, building a modern factory on Chicago's west side to mass-produce bicycles at lower cost. He finalized a purchase of motorcycle manufacturer Excelsior Company in 1912, and in 1917 added the Henderson Company to form Excelsior-Henderson. In an atmosphere of general decline elsewhere in the industry, Schwinn's new motorcycle division thrived, and by 1928 was in third place behind Indian and Harley-Davidson.

=== Depression years ===
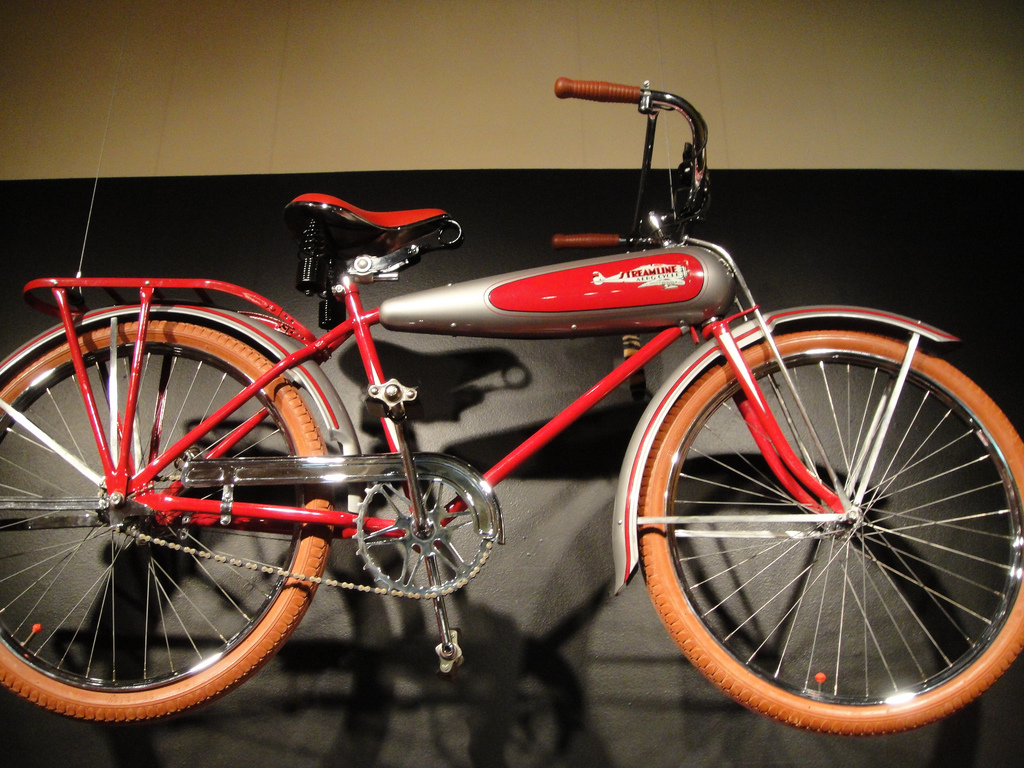
Schwinn AeroCycle in Longmont Museum & Cultural Center

At the close of the 1920s, the stock market crash decimated the American motorcycle industry, taking Excelsior-Henderson with it. Arnold, Schwinn, & Co. (as it remained until 1967) was on the verge of bankruptcy. With no buyers, Excelsior-Henderson motorcycles were discontinued in 1931. Ignaz's son, Frank W. "F. W." Schwinn, took over day-to-day operations at Schwinn. Putting all company efforts towards bicycles, he succeeded in developing a low-cost model that brought Schwinn recognition as an innovative company, as well as a product that would continue to sell during the inevitable downturns in business cycles. After traveling to Europe to get ideas, F. W. Schwinn returned to Chicago and in 1933 introduced the Schwinn B-10E Motorbike, actually a youth's bicycle designed to imitate a motorcycle. The company revised the model the next year and renamed it the Aerocycle. For the Aerocycle, F. W. Schwinn persuaded American Rubber Co. to make 2.125-inch-wide (54.0 mm) balloon tires, while adding streamlined fenders, an imitation "gas tank", a streamlined, chrome-plated headlight, and a push-button bicycle bell. The bicycle would eventually come to be known as a paperboy bike or cruiser.

Schwinn was soon sponsoring a bicycle racing team headed by Emil Wastyn, who designed the team bikes, and the company competed in six-day racing across the United States with riders such as Jerry Rodman and Russell Allen. In 1938, Frank W. Schwinn officially introduced the Paramount series. Developed from experiences gained in racing, Schwinn established Paramount as their answer to high-end, professional competition bicycles. The Paramount used high-strength chrome-molybdenum steel alloy tubing and expensive brass lug-brazed construction. During the next twenty years, most of the Paramount bikes would be built in limited numbers at a small frame shop headed by Wastyn, in spite of Schwinn's continued efforts to bring all frame production into the factory.

On May 17, 1941, Alfred Letourneur was able to beat the motor-paced world speed record on a bicycle, reaching 108.92 miles per hour (175.29 km/h) on a Schwinn Paramount bicycle riding behind a car in Bakersfield, California.

=== Industry dominance ===
By 1950, Schwinn had decided the time was right to grow the brand. At the time, most bicycle manufacturers in the United States sold in bulk to department stores, which in turn sold them as store brand models. Schwinn decided to try something different. With the exception of B. F. Goodrich bicycles, sold in tire stores, Schwinn eliminated the practice of producing private label bicycles in 1950, insisting that the Schwinn brand and guarantee appear on all products. In exchange for ensuring the presence of the Schwinn name, distributors retained the right to distribute Schwinn bikes to any hardware store, toy store, or bicycle shop that ordered them. In 1952, F. W. Schwinn tasked a new team to plan future business strategy, consisting of marketing supervisor Ray Burch, general manager Bill Stoeffhaas, and design supervisor Al Fritz.

In the 1950s, Schwinn began to aggressively cultivate bicycle retailers, persuading them to sell Schwinns as their predominant, if not exclusive brand. During this period, bicycle sales enjoyed relatively slow growth, with the bulk of sales going to youth models. In 1900, during the height of the first bicycle boom, annual United States sales by all bicycle manufacturers had briefly topped one million. By 1960, annual sales reached to 4.4 million. Nevertheless, Schwinn's share of the market was increasing, and would reach in excess of 1 million bicycles per year by the end of the decade.

In 1946, imports of foreign-made bicycles had increased tenfold over the previous year, to 46,840 bicycles; of that total, 95 per cent were from Great Britain. The postwar appearance of imported "English racers" (actually three-speed "sport" roadsters from Great Britain and West Germany) found a ready market among United States buyers seeking bicycles for exercise and recreation in the suburbs. Though substantially heavier than later European-style "racer" or sport/touring bikes, Americans found them a revelation, as they were still much lighter than existing models produced by Schwinn and other American bicycle manufacturers. Imports of foreign-made "English racers", sports roadsters, and recreational bicycles steadily increased through the early 1950s. Schwinn first responded to the new challenge by producing its own middleweight version of the "English racer". The middleweight incorporated most of the features of the English racer, but had wider tires and wheels.

The company also joined with other United States bicycle manufacturers in a campaign to raise import tariffs across the board on all imported bicycles. In August 1955, the Eisenhower administration implemented a 22.5% tariff rate for three out of four categories of bicycles. However, the most popular adult category, lightweight or "racer" bicycles, were only raised to 11.25%. The administration noted that the United States industry offered no direct competition in this category, and that lightweight bikes competed only indirectly with balloon-tire or cruiser bicycles. The share of the United States market taken by foreign-made bicycles dropped to 28.5% of the market, and remained under 30% through 1964. Despite the increased tariff, the only structural change in foreign imports during this period was a temporary decline in bicycles imported from Great Britain in favor of lower-priced models from the Netherlands and Germany. In 1961, after a successful appeal by bicycle importers, the Eisenhower tariffs were declared invalid by the Court of United States Customs Appeals, and President Kennedy imposed a new tariff rate at 50% on foreign-made bicycles, a rate which remained in place until 1964.

While every large bicycle manufacturer sponsored or participated in bicycle racing competition of some sort to keep up with the newest trends in technology, Schwinn had restricted its racing activities to events inside the United States, where Schwinn bicycles predominated. As a result, Schwinns became increasingly dated in both styling and technology. By 1957, the Paramount series, once a premier racing bicycle, had atrophied from a lack of attention and modernization. Aside from some new frame lug designs, the designs, methods and tooling were the same as had been used in the 1930s. After a crash-course in new frame-building techniques and derailleur technology, Schwinn introduced an updated Paramount with Reynolds 531 double-butted tubing, Nervex lugsets and bottom bracket shells, as well as Campagnolo derailleur dropouts. The Paramount continued as a limited production model, built in small numbers in a small apportioned area of the old Chicago assembly factory. The new frame and component technology incorporated in the Paramount largely failed to reach Schwinn's mass-market bicycle lines. In 1963 following the death of F. W. Schwinn, grandson Frank Valentine Schwinn took over management of the company.

=== Marketing and antitrust issues ===
By the late 1950s, Schwinn's exclusive marketing practices were well entrenched in the United States, practices that had ensured a dominant position in the United States bicycle market. In order to prevent competition among its wholesalers, Schwinn assisted them by dividing up the national market. Schwinn also strengthened its dealer network, shrinking the number of authorized dealers. Since Schwinn could decide who got their bikes and who didn't, the company rewarded the highest volume dealers with location exclusivity, as well as mandating service standards and layouts. In response, the company was sued by the Department of Justice in 1957 for restraint of trade. In a ten-year legal battle, many of Schwinn's practices were upheld by the courts: judges ruled they had the right to have their bicycles sold by retailers equipped to service the bikes as well as sell them. However, in a ruling by the Supreme Court of the United States in 1967, U.S. v. Arnold, Schwinn & Co., Schwinn was found guilty of restraint of trade by preventing distributors shipping bicycles to unapproved dealers. Though the Arnold decision would be essentially overturned in later rulings, the company stopped working solely through independent local distributors and constructed four regional warehouses from which bicycles would — legally — be sent to shops. While this solved the problem of unfair trade practice with the courts, the new warehouses and distribution system cost millions of dollars at a time of rising competition from foreign manufacturers.

=== Child and youth markets ===
During the 1960s, Schwinn aggressively campaigned to retain and expand its dominance of the child and youth bicycle markets. The company advertised heavily on television, and was an early sponsor (from 1958) of the children's television program Captain Kangaroo. The Captain himself was enlisted to regularly hawk Schwinn-brand bicycles to the show's audience, typically six years old and under. As these children matured, it was believed they would ask for Schwinn bicycles from their parents. By 1971, United States government councils had objected to Schwinn's marketing practices. In response, Schwinn had Captain Kangaroo alter its format. The Captain no longer insisted that viewers buy a Schwinn, but instead made regular on-air consultations of a new character, "Mr. Schwinn Dealer".

=== The Corvette ===
Introduction of the 1954 Corvette, middleweight bicycle.

Schwinn developed the Corvette in 1954, after their catalog, for that year, had been in use. Therefore, with the release of a single photograph, the Corvette was introduced. The picture showed company executives standing behind their new product, that would remain in production for 10 years. 1955 was the first year in which the Corvette appeared in the Schwinn catalog; it was Schwinn's top listing in their "middleweight" category.

=== Schwinn Tandems ===
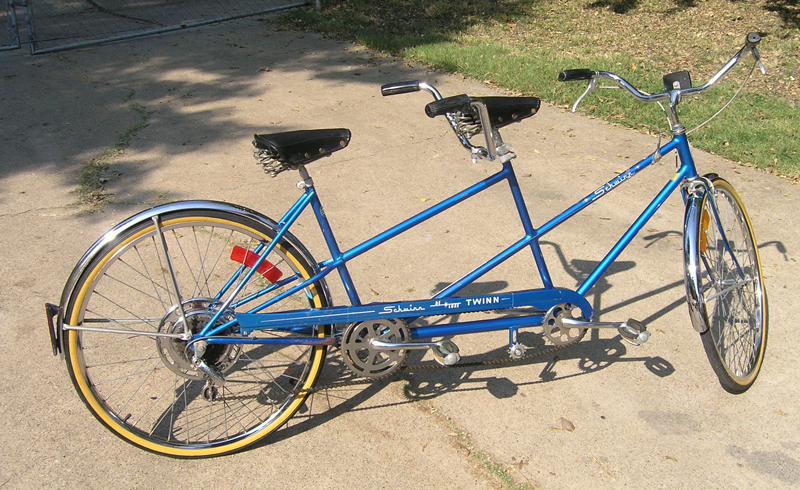
1973 Schwinn Deluxe Twinn in Sky Blue

From Schwinn's earliest years in the 1890s to the 1980s, Schwinn produced a series of tandem bicycles. From 1946 to 1963, the tandem frames were hand brazed with seamless chromoly tubing and featured a short wheelbase with a curved rear seat tube, heavy duty tandem components, and an eccentric front bottom bracket for chain adjustment. In 1959, the tandems were given the model name Town & Country. In 1963, the electro-welded Schwinn Twinn tandem was introduced at a retail price of $99.95, with the Town & Country at $175. The Town & Country disappeared from the catalog in 1964. The Twinn was eventually offered in three different models: the single speed Twinn, a two speed semi-automatic, and the five speed Deluxe Twinn. The Twinn used a straight rear seat tube and an idler sprocket to adjust the timing chain tension, typically found on low-priced tandems. In 1969, the Paramount tandem was introduced, returning to fillet-brazed, seamless chromoly tubing and an eccentric front bottom bracket chain adjustment system. It kept some of the heavy duty features of the discontinued Town & Country model but lengthened the wheelbase and fitted with lightweight components including TA (later Campagnolo) aluminum cranksets, aluminum 27" rims on Campagnolo hubs with heavy, 12-gauge spokes, Brooks leather saddles, Cinelli handlebars and stem, and Campagnolo pedals. 1969 retail price was $397 for both the double-diamond and rear step-through frame designs, each in two different frame sizes in the customer's choice of color. The Paramount tandems were sold alongside the Twinn until 1979, when the retail price of the Paramount had risen to $1,395. In 1975, Schwinn re-introduced the curved rear seat tube on the Paramount models, calling it a "short coupled" design. The Twinn series continued through 1982. From 1989 through 1992, Schwinn offered a tandem called the Duo Sport, which used a lugged frame built with oversized tubing in Japan and equipped with quality, mid-range components. Like the Paramount tandems, the Duo Sport was offered in two different frame sizes.

=== The Sting-Ray ===
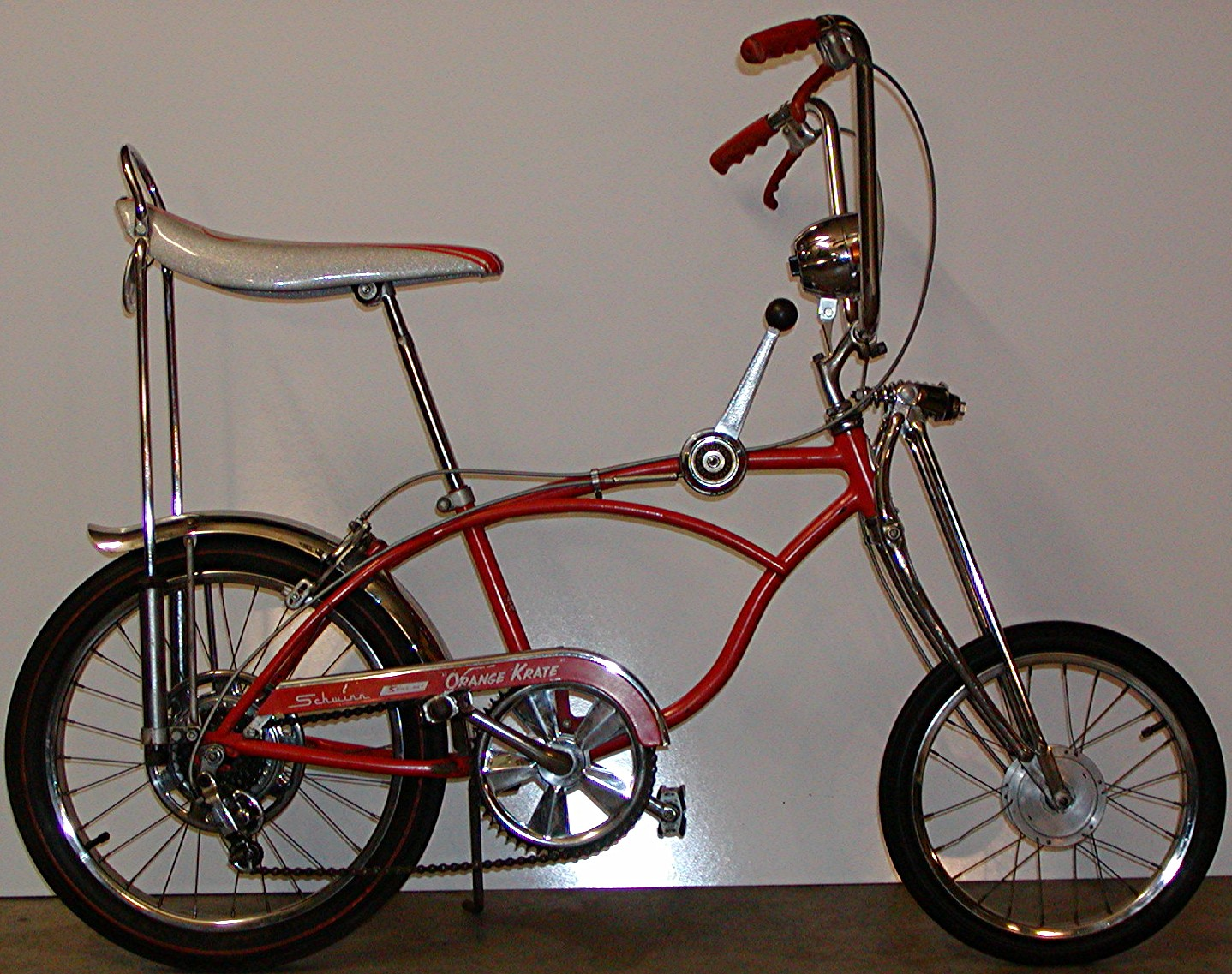
1968 Schwinn Sting-Ray Orange Krate 5-speed

In 1962, Schwinn's designer Al Fritz heard about a new youth trend centered in California for retrofitting bicycles with the accoutrements of motorcycles customized in the "bobber" or "chopper" style, including high-rise, "ape-hanger" handlebars, and low-rider "banana seats". Inspired, he designed a mass-production bike for the youth market known as Project J-38. The result, a wheelie bike, was introduced to the public as the Schwinn Sting-Ray in June 1963.

The Sting-Ray had ape-hanger handlebars, Persons's Solo Polo Seat banana seat, and 20-inch (510 mm) tires. Sales were initially slow, as many parents desiring a bicycle for their children did not relate to the new, unconventional design. After a few appeared on America's streets and neighborhoods, many young riders would accept nothing else, and sales took off.

In the December 1963 Schwinn Reporter, Schwinn announced the arrival of the Deluxe Sting-Ray. This model included Fenders, white-wall tires, and a padded Solo polo seat.

In July 1964, Schwinn announced the arrival of the Super Deluxe Sting-Ray. This model included a front spring-fork, a new sleeker Sting-Ray banana seat, and a Person's Hi-loop Sissy bar. The Super Deluxe also gave the rider a choice of White wall tires or the new Yellow oval rear Slik tire paired with a front black wall Westwind tire.

By 1965, a host of American and foreign manufacturers were offering their own version of the Sting-Ray.

=== The Ten Speed ===
A growing number of US teens and young adults were purchasing imported European sport racing or sport touring bicycles, many fitted with multiple derailleur-shifted gears. Schwinn decided to meet the challenge by developing two lines of sport or road 'racer' bicycles. One was already in the catalog — the limited production Paramount series. As always, the Paramount spared no expense; the bicycles were given high-quality lightweight lugged steel frames using double-butted tubes of Reynolds 531 and fitted with quality European components including Campagnolo derailleurs, hubs, and gears. The Paramount series had limited production numbers, making vintage examples quite rare today. Starting in 1960, for the rest of the market, Schwinn offered the Schwinn Varsity, Continental, and LeTour -- now equipped as multi-geared sport bikes (10-speeds), and designed to imitate the style of the new narrow-tired 'racing' and sport bikes from Europe, though not their performance. The 1960 Varsity was introduced as an 8-speed bike, but in mid-1961 was upgraded to 10 speeds. Other road bikes were introduced by Schwinn in the early and mid 1960s, such as the Superior, Sierra, and Super Continental, but these were only produced for a few years. The Varsity and Continental sold in large numbers through the 1960s and early 1970s, becoming Scwhinn's leading models. The major difference between the two models was the use of a tubular front fork on the Continental -- both bikes used the same frame design, a lugless, steel unit, using Schwinn's standard Ashtabula cranksets and welded in such a way that the joints were smoothly filled (similar to the joints in 21st-century composite frames). The wheel rims were likewise robust, chromed, stamped steel with a unique profile designed to hold the tire bead securely, even if pressure were low or lost.

In the late 1960s, the Varsity and Continental pioneered the use of auxiliary brake levers, which allowed the rider to rest hands on the straight, horizontal center section of the ram's horn handlebars, yet still have braking control. To further improve control from this more-erect riding position, the levers used to move the derailleurs (shifting the chain from one sprocket to the next) were moved from the traditional position on the "down tube" to the top of the headset, on a ring which would turn with the handlebar stem. This feature, attractive to older riders, soon found its way to other Schwinn models, especially those intended for senior citizens.

By the mid-1970s, competition from lightweight and feature-rich imported bikes was making strong inroads in the budget-priced and beginners' market. While Schwinn's popular lines were far more durable than the budget bikes, they were also far heavier and more expensive, and parents were realizing that most of the budget bikes would outlast most kids' interest in bicycling. Although the Varsity and Continental series would still be produced in large numbers into the 1980s, even Schwinn recognized the growing market in young adults and environmentally-oriented purchasers, devoting the bulk of their marketing to lighter models intended to pull sales back from the imports.

=== The bicycle boom ===
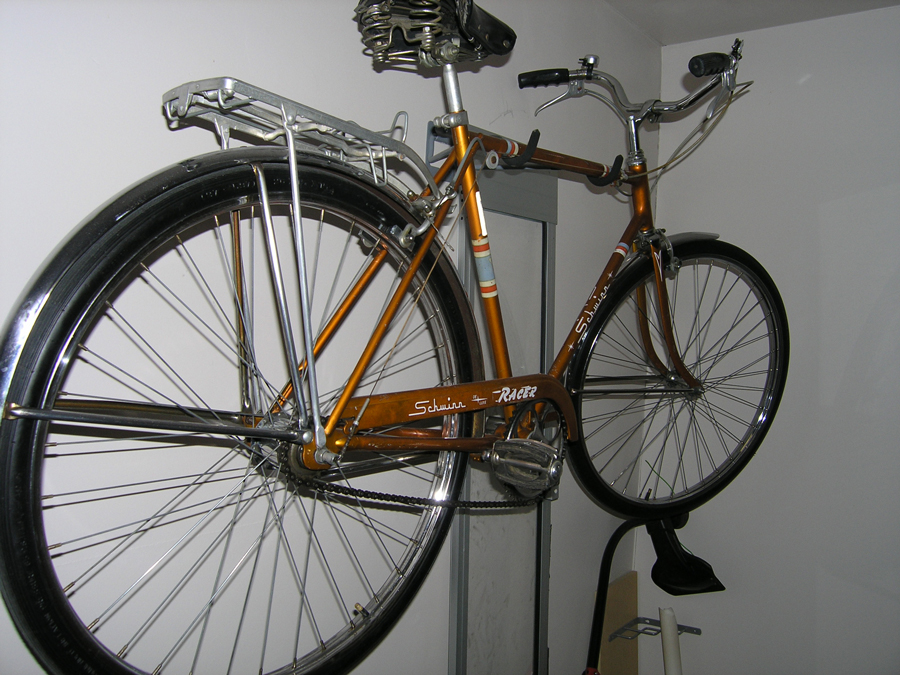
1966 Schwinn Racer Deluxe in coppertone

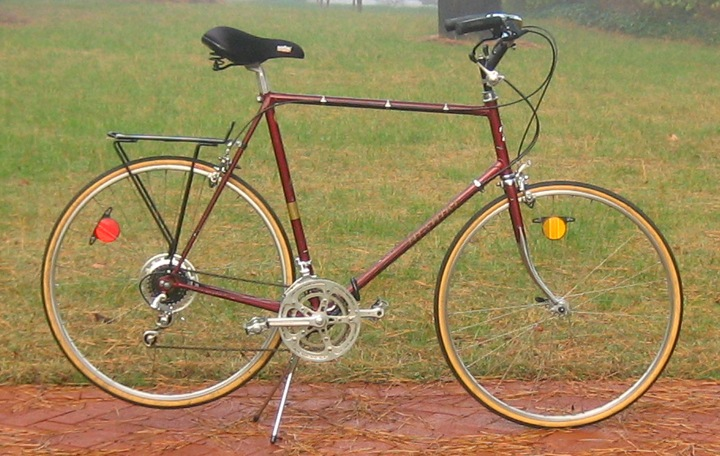
1977 Nishiki International Typical 1970s Bike boom ten-speed road bike

The Sting-Ray sales boom of the 1960s accelerated in 1970, with United States bicycle sales doubling over a period of two years. However, there were clear warning signs on the horizon.

Despite a huge increase in popularity of lightweight European sport or road racing bicycles in the United States, Schwinn adhered to its existing strategy in the lightweight adult road bike market. For those unable to afford the Paramount, this meant a Schwinn 'sports' bike with a heavy steel electro-forged frame along with steel components such as wheels, stems, cranks, and handlebars from the company's established United States suppliers. Though weighing slightly less, the mid-priced Schwinn Superior or Sports Tourer was almost indistinguishable from Schwinn's other heavy, mass-produced models, such as the Varsity and Continental. While competitive in the 1960s, by 1972 these bicycles were much heavier and less responsive in comparison to the new sport and racing bicycles arriving from England, France, Italy, and increasingly, Japan.

Another problem was Schwinn's failure to design and market its bicycles to specific, identifiable buyers, especially the growing number of cyclists interested in road racing or touring. Instead, most Schwinn derailleur bikes were marketed to the general leisure market, equipped with heavy "old timer" accessories such as kickstands that cycling aficionados had long since abandoned. More and more cyclists, especially younger buyers, began to insist on stronger steel alloys (which allowed for lighter frames), responsive frame geometry, aluminum components, advanced derailleur shifting, and multiple gears. When they failed to find what they wanted at Schwinn, they went elsewhere. While the Paramount still sold in limited numbers to this market, the model's customer base began to age, changing from primarily bike racers to older, wealthier riders looking for the ultimate bicycle. Schwinn sold an impressive 1.5 million bicycles in 1974, but would pay the price for failing to keep up with new developments in bicycle technology and buying trends.

With their aging product line, Schwinn failed to dominate the huge sport bike boom of 1971–1975, which saw millions of 10-speed bicycles sold to new cyclists. Schwinn did allow some dealers to sell imported road racing bikes, and by 1973 was using the Schwinn name on the Le Tour, a Japanese-made low-cost sport/touring 10-speed bicycle. Schwinn developed strong trading relationships with two Japanese bicycle manufacturers in particular, Bridgestone and (via its bicycling arm) Panasonic. Though these met initial dealer resistance as "imports" and were not included in the Schwinn consumer catalog, it was soon realized that the Panasonic and Bridgestone 'Schwinn' bicycles were fully the equal of the American-made versions in quality and performance. Schwinn soon had a range of low, mid- and upper-level bicycles all imported from Japan. Schwinn's standard road bike model from Panasonic was the World Traveler, which had a high-quality lugged steel frame and Shimano components. Schwinn also marketed a top-shelf touring model from Panasonic, the World Voyager, lugged with butted Tange chrome-molybdenum alloy tubing, Shimano derailleurs, and SunTour bar-end shifters, a serious challenge to the Paramount series at half the price.

By 1975, bicycle customers interested in medium-priced road and touring bicycles had largely gravitated towards Japanese or European brands. Unlike Schwinn, many of these brands were perennial participants in professional bicycle racing, and their production road bicycles at least possessed the cachet and visual lineage of their racing heritage, if not always their componentry. One example was Peugeot, which won several Tour de France victories using race bikes with frames occasionally constructed by small race-oriented framebuilders such as Masi, suitably repainted in Team Peugeot colors. In reality, mass-market French manufacturers such as Peugeot were not infrequently criticized for material and assembly quality — as well as stagnant technology — in their low- and mid-level product lines. Nevertheless, Peugeot proudly advertised its victorious racing heritage at every opportunity. While not as prominent at the winner's podium, Japanese brands such as Fuji and Panasonic offered consistently high quality, reasonable prices, and state-of-the-art-derailleur, crankset, and gearing design. Unlike Schwinn, most Japanese bicycle manufacturers were quick to adopt the latest European road racing geometries, new steel alloys, and modern manufacturing techniques. As a result, their moderately-priced bicycles, equipped with the same Japanese-made components, usually weighed less and performed better than competitive models made by Schwinn. Schwinn brand loyalty began to suffer as huge numbers of buyers came to retailers asking for the latest sport and racing road bikes from European or Japanese manufacturers. By 1979, even the Paramount had been passed, technologically speaking, by a new generation of American as well as foreign custom bicycle manufacturers.

=== BMX bicycles ===
Schwinn also largely failed to capitalize on a new trend in Southern California: BMX racing. After first claiming it to be a dangerous sport, management changed their tune — too late — when they introduced the Scrambler in 1975, which evolved into a BMX design in the late 1970s, but it was heavier than designs from other manufacturers. The Sting-Ray based Scrambler spawned the light weight, fully competition capable, chrome-molybdenum-tubed Competition Scrambler in late 1976, Scrambler 36/36, the Mag Scrambler in 1977, and The Sting in 1979, with full Reynolds, double butted chrome-molybdenum frame that was made in the same assembly area as the Paramount road racing frames.

Schwinn followed the Scrambler line with the Predator in 1982, their next step into the modern BMX market. The Predator took just eight percent of the BMX market. Schwinn had a successful BMX factory supported racing team (beginning in 1976) made up of some of the best riders of the day. They were even used for an episode of the TV show CHiPs.

=== Mountain bikes ===
By the late 1970s, a new bicycle sport begun by enthusiasts in Northern California had grown into a new type of all-terrain bicycle, the mountain bike. Mountain bikes were originally based on Schwinn balloon-tired cruiser bicycles fitted with derailleur gears and called "Klunkers". A few participants began designing and building small numbers of mountain bikes with frames made out of modern butted chrome-molybdenum alloy steel. When the sport's original inventors demonstrated their new frame design, Schwinn marketing personnel initially discounted the growing popularity of the mountain bike, concluding that it would become a short-lived fad. The company briefly (1978–1979) produced a bicycle styled after the California mountain bikes, the Klunker 5. Using the standard electro-forged cantilever frame, and fitted with five-speed derailleur gears and knobby tires, the Klunker 5 was never heavily marketed, and was not even listed in the Schwinn product catalog. Unlike its progenitors, the Klunker proved incapable of withstanding hard off-road use, and after an unsuccessful attempt to reintroduce the model as the Spitfire 5, it was dropped from production.

The company's next answer to requests for a Schwinn mountain bike was the King Sting and the Sidewinder, inexpensive BMX-derived bicycles fabricated from existing electro-forged frame designs, and using off-the-shelf BMX parts. This proved to be a major miscalculation, as several new United States startup companies began producing high-quality frames designed from the ground up, and sourced from new, modern plants in Japan and Taiwan using new mass-production technologies such as TIG welding.

Schwinn fielded a mountain bike racing team in the United States where their team rider Ned Overend won two consecutive NORBA Mountain Biking National Championships for the team in 1986 and 1987. Schwinn's new competitors such as Specialized and Fisher MountainBikes were soon selling hundreds of thousands of mountain bikes at competitive prices to eager customers, setting sales records in a market niche that soon grew to enormous proportions.

=== Factory and retooling issues ===
By this time, Schwinn's bicycle factory was completely outmoded in comparison to modern bicycle manufacturing centers in Japan and Taiwan, who had continually invested in new and up-to-date manufacturing techniques and materials, including new joinery techniques and the latest lightweight chrome-molybdenum alloy steel, and later, aluminum. The company considered relocating to a single facility in Tulsa, Oklahoma, but financing the project would have required outside investors, perhaps even foreign ones. Schwinn's board of directors rejected the new plant in 1978.

=== Labor troubles, bankruptcy and demise ===
In October 1979, Edward R. Schwinn, Jr. took over the presidency of Schwinn from his uncle Frank, ensuring continuity of Schwinn family in the operations of the company. However, worker dissatisfaction, seldom a problem in the early years, grew with steep increases in inflation. In late 1980, the Schwinn Chicago factory workers voted to affiliate with the United Auto Workers. Plant assembly workers began a strike for higher pay in September 1980, and 1,400 assembly workers walked off the job for thirteen weeks. Although the strike ended in February 1981, only about 65% of the prior workforce was recalled to work. By this time, increasingly stiff competition from lower-cost competition in Asia resulted in declining market share. These problems were exacerbated by the inefficiency of producing modern bicycles in the 80-year-old Chicago factory equipped with outdated equipment and ancient inventory and information systems. After numerous meetings, the board of directors voted to source most Schwinn bicycle production from their established bicycle supplier in Japan, Panasonic Bicycle. As Schwinn's first outsourced bicycles, Panasonic had been the only vendor to meet Schwinn's production requirements. Later, Schwinn would sign a production supply agreement with Giant Bicycles of Taiwan. As time passed, Schwinn would import more and more Asian-made bicycles to carry the Schwinn brand, eventually becoming more a marketer than a maker of bikes.

In an attempt to preserve remaining market share and avoid a unionized workforce, Schwinn later moved remaining United States bicycle production to a new plant in Greenville, Mississippi, where bicycles could be assembled at lower cost using parts sourced from Asia. The Greenville plant was not a success, as it was remote from both the corporate headquarters as well as the West coast ports where the material components arrived from Taiwan and Japan. Additionally, Asian manufacturers could still produce and assemble high-quality bicycles at a far lower per-unit cost than Schwinn at its plant in Mississippi, which had to import parts, then assemble them using higher-priced United States labor. The Greenville manufacturing facility, which had lost money each year of its operation, finally closed in 1991, laying off 250 workers in the process.

The Current Schwinn Headbadge for mass market stores

After a series of production cuts and labor force reductions, Schwinn was able to restructure its operations. The company renegotiated loans by putting up the company and the name as collateral, and increased production of the Airdyne exercise bicycle, a moneymaker even in bad times. The company took advantage of the continued demand for mountain bikes, redesigning its product line with Schwinn-designed chrome-molybdenum alloy steel frames. Supplied by manufacturers in Asia, the new arrangement enabled Schwinn to reduce costs and stay competitive with Asian bicycle companies. In Taiwan, Schwinn was able to conclude a new production agreement with Giant Bicycles, transferring Schwinn's frame design and manufacturing expertise to Giant in the process. With this partnership, Schwinn increased their bicycle sales to 500,000 per year by 1985. Schwinn's annual sales soon neared the million mark, and the company turned a profit in the late 1980s. However, after unsuccessfully attempting to purchase a minority share in Giant Bicycles, Edward Schwinn Jr. negotiated a separate deal with the China Bicycle Co. (CBC) to produce bicycles to be sold under the Schwinn brand. In retaliation, Giant introduced its own line of Giant-branded bikes for sale to retailers carrying Schwinn bikes. Both Giant and CBC used the dies, plans, and technological expertise from Schwinn to greatly expand the market share of bicycles made under their own proprietary brands, first in Europe, and later in the United States.

By 1990, other United States bicycle companies with reputations for excellence in design such as Trek, Specialized, and Cannondale had cut further into Schwinn's market. Unable to produce bicycles in the United States at a competitive cost, by the end of 1991 Schwinn was sourcing its bicycles from overseas manufacturers. This period in Schwinn's history plays a cameo role in a novel by Dave Eggers, A Hologram for the King (2012). Seeking to increase its brand recognition, Schwinn established additional company-operated shops, a move that alienated existing independent bike retailers in cities where the company stores had opened. This in turn led to further inroads by domestic and foreign competitors. Faced with a downward sales spiral, Schwinn went into bankruptcy in 1992. The company and name were bought by the Zell/Chilmark Fund, an investment group, in 1993. Zell moved Schwinn's corporate headquarters to Boulder, Colorado.

In 1993, Richard Schwinn, great-grandson of Ignaz Schwinn, with business partner Marc Muller, purchased the Schwinn Paramount plant in Waterford, Wisconsin, where Paramounts were built since 1980. They founded Waterford Precision Cycles, which ceased operations in 2023. In 2003 they employed 18 workers building lightweight bicycles.

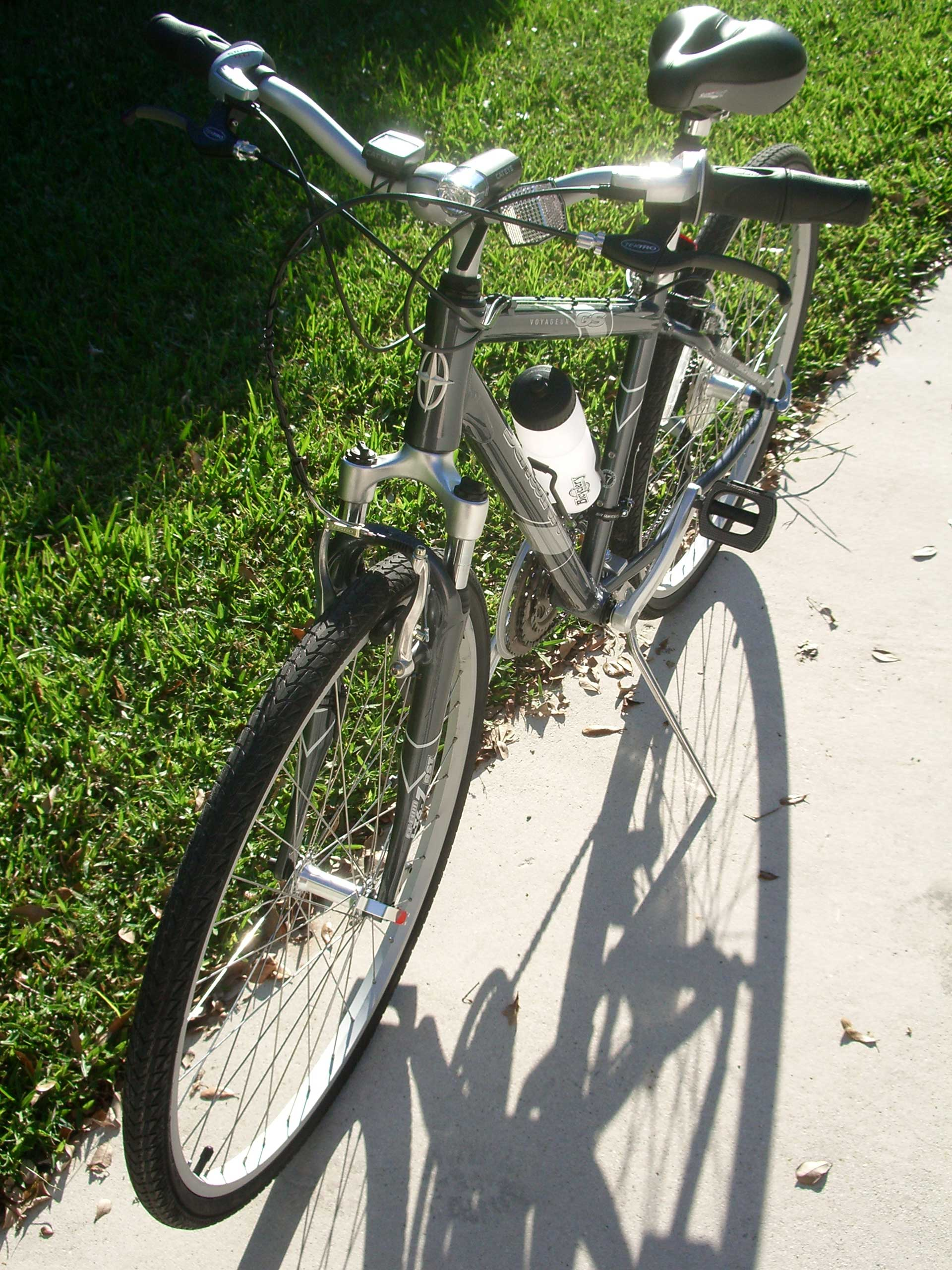
A Schwinn Voyageur GS hybrid bicycle sold after the company was bought by Pacific Cycle

In late 1997, Questor Partners Fund, led by Jay Alix and Dan Lufkin, purchased Schwinn Bicycles. Questor/Schwinn later purchased GT Bicycles in 1998 for $8 a share in cash, roughly $80 million. The new company produced a series of well-regarded mountain bikes bearing the Schwinn name, called the Homegrown series. In 2001, Schwinn/GT declared bankruptcy.

=== Sale to Pacific and Nautilus ===
Logo used from 2011 to 2021

In September 2001, the Schwinn Company, its assets, and the rights to the brand, together with that of the GT Bicycle, was purchased at a bankruptcy auction by Pacific Cycle, a company previously known for mass-market brands owned by Wind Point Partners. In 2004, Pacific Cycle was in turn acquired by Dorel Industries. Once America's preeminent bicycle manufacturer, the Schwinn brand, as with many other bicycle manufacturers, affixed itself to fabrication in China and Taiwan, fueling most of its corporate parent's growth. In 2010, Dorel launched a major advertising campaign to revive and contemporize the Schwinn brand by associating it with consumer childhood memories of the company, including a reintroduction of the Schwinn Sting-Ray. In 2021, Dutch conglomerate Pon Holdings acquired Pacific Cycle.

Direct Focus, Inc., a marketing company for fitness and healthy lifestyle products, acquired the assets of Schwinn/GT's fitness equipment division. Direct Focus, Inc. subsequently became Nautilus, Inc.

== Models ==
Schwinn sells essentially two lines of bicycles. One is a line of discount bikes offered through mass-merchandisers such as Wal-Mart, Sears and Kmart. The other line known as the Signature Series, featured on the website, are higher-end models sold through specialty shops. Schwinn produces the following types of bicycles:

- Cruisers
- Mountain
- Road
- Hybrid
- Urban includes folders
- Kids
- Electric
- Stationary
- BMX

== Scooters ==
Starting in 2005, Schwinn also marketed Motorscooters under the Schwinn Motorsports brand. Production ceased in 2011 (approx).

== Gear ==
Schwinn also produces the following gear: Helmets & Pads, Pumps, Saddles, Lights, Storage, Extras, Repair, Bike trailers, and Jogging strollers.

== See also ==
- Schwinn Racer
- No Hands: The Wild Ride of the Schwinn Bicycle Company: an American Institution, Judith Crown & Glenn Coleman, ISBN 978-0805035537
- No Hands: The Wild Ride of the Schwinn Bicycle Company, documentary film.
