= Henderson Motorcycle =

Motorcycle manufacturer

Henderson was a manufacturer of in-line 4-cylinder motorcycles from 1912 until 1931. They were the largest and fastest motorcycles of their time, and appealed to both sport riders and police departments. Police favored them for traffic patrol because they were faster than anything else on the roads. The company began during the golden age of motorcycling, and ended during the Great Depression.

== Henderson Motorcycle Co. ==
=== The founders: William and Tom Henderson ===
In 1911 the American Henderson Motorcycle Co, 268 Jefferson Ave., Detroit, Michigan, was formed by William G. Henderson in partnership with his brother Tom W. Henderson. Will had the ideas and enthusiasm for motorcycling, and Tom had the better financial acumen. The brothers were inducted to the Motorcycle Hall of Fame in 1998.

==== 1911 prototype ====
The Henderson brothers constructed a single prototype motorcycle during 1911. The prototype had the belt drive typical of the times, but this was changed to chain drive for production models.

==== 1912 Henderson Four ====
Henderson Motorcycle promptly announced a new 57 cubic inch (934 cc) IOE four-cylinder 7 hp motorcycle, with the engine mounted inline with the frame and chain drive. Production began in 1911, using the in-line four-cylinder engine and long wheelbase that would become Henderson trademarks, and it was available to the public in January 1912. Advertisements boasted 7 HP and a price of $325.

It was the third four-cylinder production motorcycle built in the United States, and featured a folding hand-crank starter handle.

==== 1913 Model B ====
Improvements included a better brake (singular), lower seating position, improved girder forks and a rectangular fuel tank, which replaced the previous cylindrical tank. It was in this year that Carl Stearns Clancy of New York returned from circling the globe on a 1912 Henderson, armed with many photographs to prove it.

==== Heath-Henderson B-4 ====
The Heath-Henderson B-4 engine was a modified Henderson motorcycle engine produced for use in Heath Parasol aircraft.

==== 1914 Model C ====
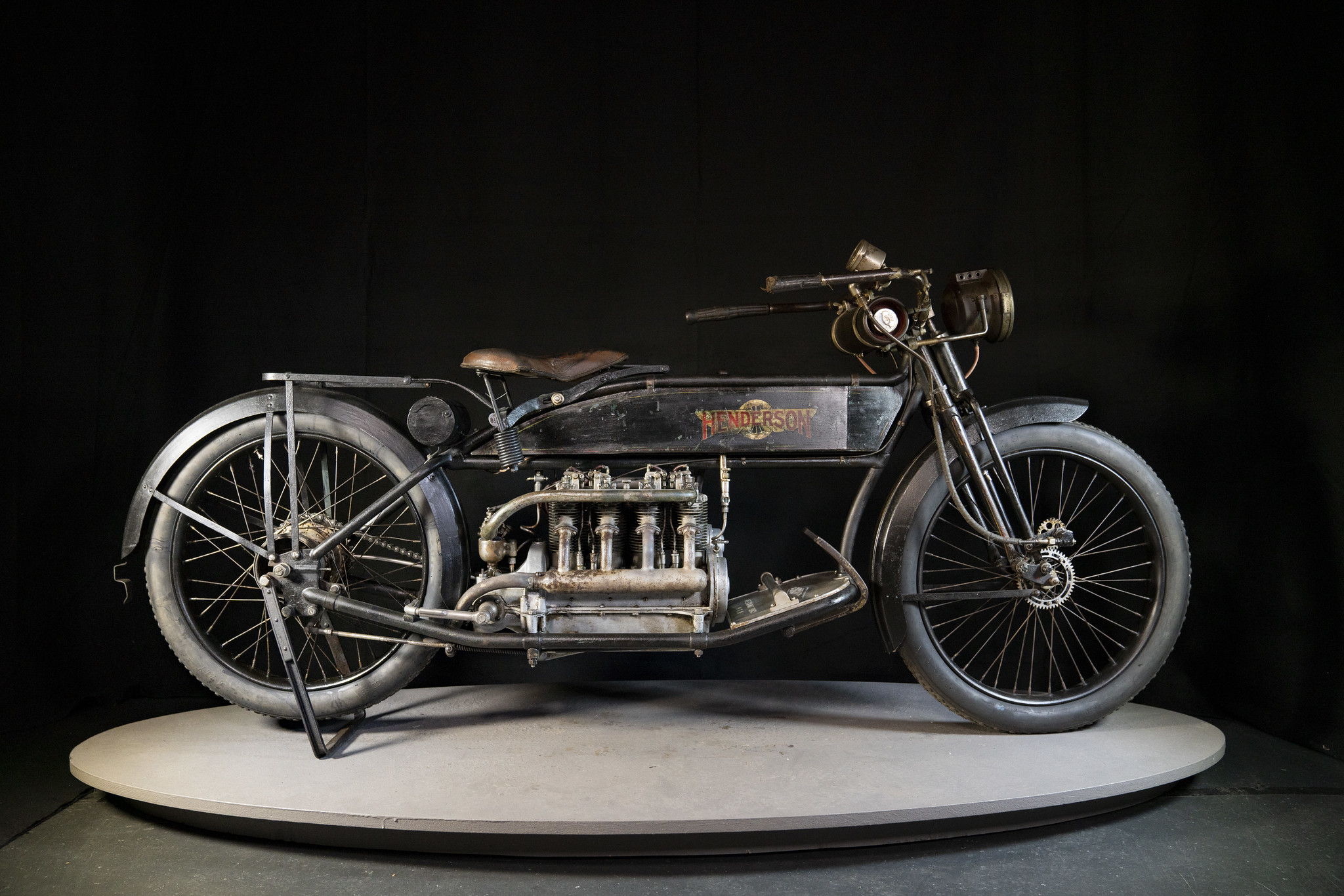
1914 Model C at the Deutsches Zweirad- und NSU-Museum, Neckarsulm, Germany

The 1914 Model C had a two-speed gearbox incorporated in the rear hub, as well as lighter pistons and adjustable seat springs. (The first Henderson to have gears.)

==== 1915 Model D and E ====
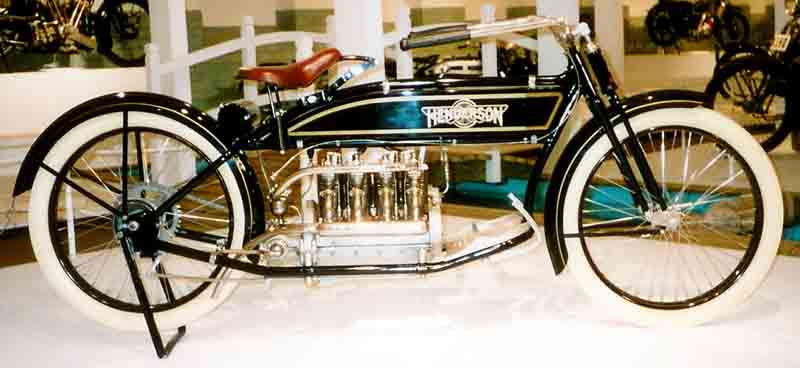
Henderson 1915

Shortly after the Model D was announced, it was followed by a Model E, with the wheelbase reduced from 65 to 58 inches, a raised instep on the footboards and a two-speed rear hub. Prices ranged from $295 for the standard model and $335 for the two-speed model.

==== 1916 Model F ====
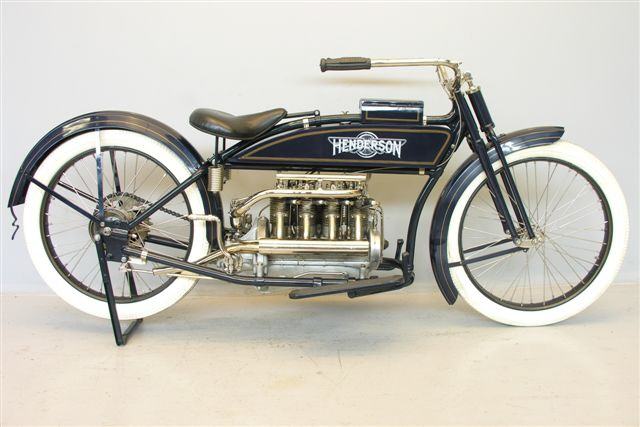
1916 Henderson Model F

The shorter wheelbase became the standard, and the engine now incorporated a cam gear driven "mechanical oiler", and a kick-start. Prices were dropped initially, but due to the impact of World War I on supplies of material and the costs of production, they were increased by $30, with the standard model costing $295 and the two-speed $325.

==== 1917 Model G ====
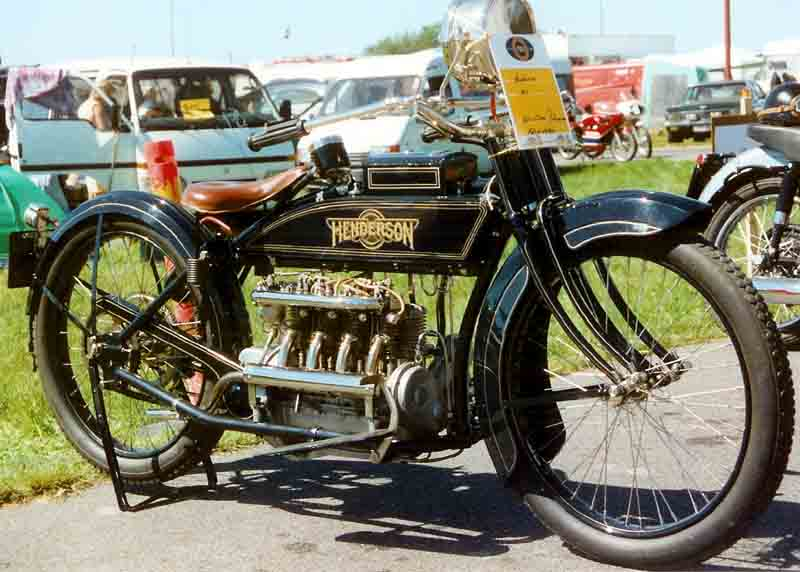
Henderson 1917

The old splash lubrication was superseded by wet sump lubrication. A three-speed gearbox was now attached to the engine and incorporated a heavy-duty clutch. Sales soared and new dealerships were established.

Alan Bedell averaged 48 mph for 1154 miles at Ascot Park in California setting a new 24‑hour record, and then, on June 13, 1917, broke the transcontinental long-distance record of 1915 (set by "Cannonball" Baker on an Indian Twin,) when he rode his 1917 Henderson from Los Angeles to the city of New York (3,296 miles) in seven days, sixteen hours, and fifteen minutes. The roads outside of towns were primitive by today's standards, and the ride would have been more like an off-road ride than the highway tour of today. The Cannonball Baker Sea-to-Shining-Sea Memorial Trophy Dash was named in Baker's honor. Roy Artley also broke Baker's Canada to Mexico record by nearly nine hours, making the journey in just over seventy-two hours.

Despite record breaking and racing successes, the effects of World War I on sales had damaged their financial position.

== Excelsior Motor Mfg. and Supply Co. ==
In 1917 the Hendersons sold the firm to Ignaz Schwinn, owner of Schwinn, the manufacturer of Schwinn bicycles and Excelsior motorbikes. Production was moved to Schwinn's Excelsior Motor Mfg. & Supply Co., 3701 Cortland Street, Chicago, Illinois.

Hendersons were marketed extensively overseas as well as in the United States during the Schwinn years. Today, there are almost as many extant Hendersons in Europe and Australia/New Zealand as in the United States. The Excelsior name had already been used in Germany and Britain, so export models were marketed as the "American-X".

When production resumed for the new Model H, the engine serial numbers began with a Z, instead of the older H.

=== 1918 Model H ===
- Engine: inline IOE
- Cylinders: Four
- Displacement: 67 cubic inches (1100 cc)
- Bore & Stroke: 2.53 × 3.0 inches (64.3 × 77.7 mm)
- Carburetor: Schebler
- Ignition: Magneto
- Transmission: 3-speed
- Forks: Henderson spring fork
- Brakes: Band, rear only
- Tire size: 3.00 × 28 inches (7.62 × 71 cm) (front and rear)

Initially Bill and Tom Henderson worked in management at Excelsior (with Tom receiving twice the pay of Bill), but Tom soon left, early in 1919, to become a Henderson exporter.

=== 1919 Model Z and Z-2 ===
The 1919 Model Z included a GE generator on the Z 2 "electric" model. The 70 cubic inch (1147 cc) 4-cylinder developed 14.2 H.P. This model had a new Henderson logo which included the red Excelsior "X". This was probably the machine used by C K Shepherd, the first Englishman to ride across the United States, coast to coast on a motorcycle in 1919. He does not mention or record the make of the motorcycle he used, other than it was a four-cylinder, 14 H.P. model, painted in khaki green - which was a colour scheme used by Henderson at the time. 1919 Also brought the twin rear brake assembly. It had an internal expanding and also external contracting bands, acting on the same rear drum. The internal brake was connected to the long hand lever, replacing its clutch function. The lever now acted as an emergency brake with detents to allow for manual braking pressure adjustments.

=== Arthur O. Lemon ===
In 1915 Arthur O. Lemon had joined Henderson as a salesman, and was employed in the Excelsior Engineering Department after the sale of Henderson. Lemon designed an updated motor for the 1920 Model K. Bill Henderson and Arthur Lemon had worked closely together in the past, but Bill did not like Lemon's changes toward heavier motorcycles. He left in 1920, before the Model K came into production, to form the Ace Motor Corporation, where he would make the lighter, faster motorcycles he had envisioned. Arthur Lemon was then put in charge of engineering for Excelsior and Henderson.

==== 1920 Model K ====
The Model K weighed more, produced more power, and was more durable and reliable than its predecessors. The 79.4 cubic inch (1301 cc) side-valve engine, with 2.6875 inch (68.3 mm) bore, and 3.5 inch (88.9 mm) stroke, was rated at 18 hp (28 bhp). The K had a top speed of 80 mph (128 km/h).

The Henderson Model K was the first motorcycle to use full pressure engine lubrication. It was also the first motorcycle to offer an optional reverse gear (for use with sidecars).

The frame had steel forgings on every joint. Forks and handlebars were the same as the Series 20 Excelsior. Among its several advanced features were electric lighting and a fully enclosed chain.

The K continued on sale to 1922, with sales increasing despite the post World War I depression. Increasingly, Henderson motorcycles were being used by law enforcement agencies, and their reputation continued to improve, with durability and distance records often falling to them.

==== 1922 DeLuxe ====
In 1922 the 28 hp (at 3400 rpm) DeLuxe was released. Improvements included a larger, more efficient carburetor, improved intake manifold and rear brakes; redesigned crankshaft, cylinder head cooling, exhaust system and seat. There were also optional Lynite die-cast alloy pistons and a revised reverse gear.

The heavier Police Department version was demonstrated first to the Chicago Police, and achieved 98 mph. When it was demonstrated to the San Diego Police a genuine 100 mph was achieved. Harley-Davidson decided to challenge Henderson to a contest that was held at Dundee Road, Chicago, in April 1922.

The Harley won the first heat, but lost the other eleven, with the Henderson exceeding 100 mph. This was a shining hour for Henderson.

Between May 30 and 31, 1922, Wells Bennet and his Henderson Deluxe set a new 24‑hour endurance record (including all the intermediate records) at the Tacoma Speedway, Washington, clocking up 1562.54 miles averaging 65.1 mph. This record was not beaten until 1933, by a Peugeot with a team of four. The solo record was not bettered until 1937 when Fred Ham's 61 cubic inch Harley averaged 76 mph.

On December 11, 1922, William Henderson was killed in a motor accident testing his new Ace. In 1923 Arthur O. Lemon left Excelsior to become chief engineer for Ace.

==== 1925 DeLuxe ====
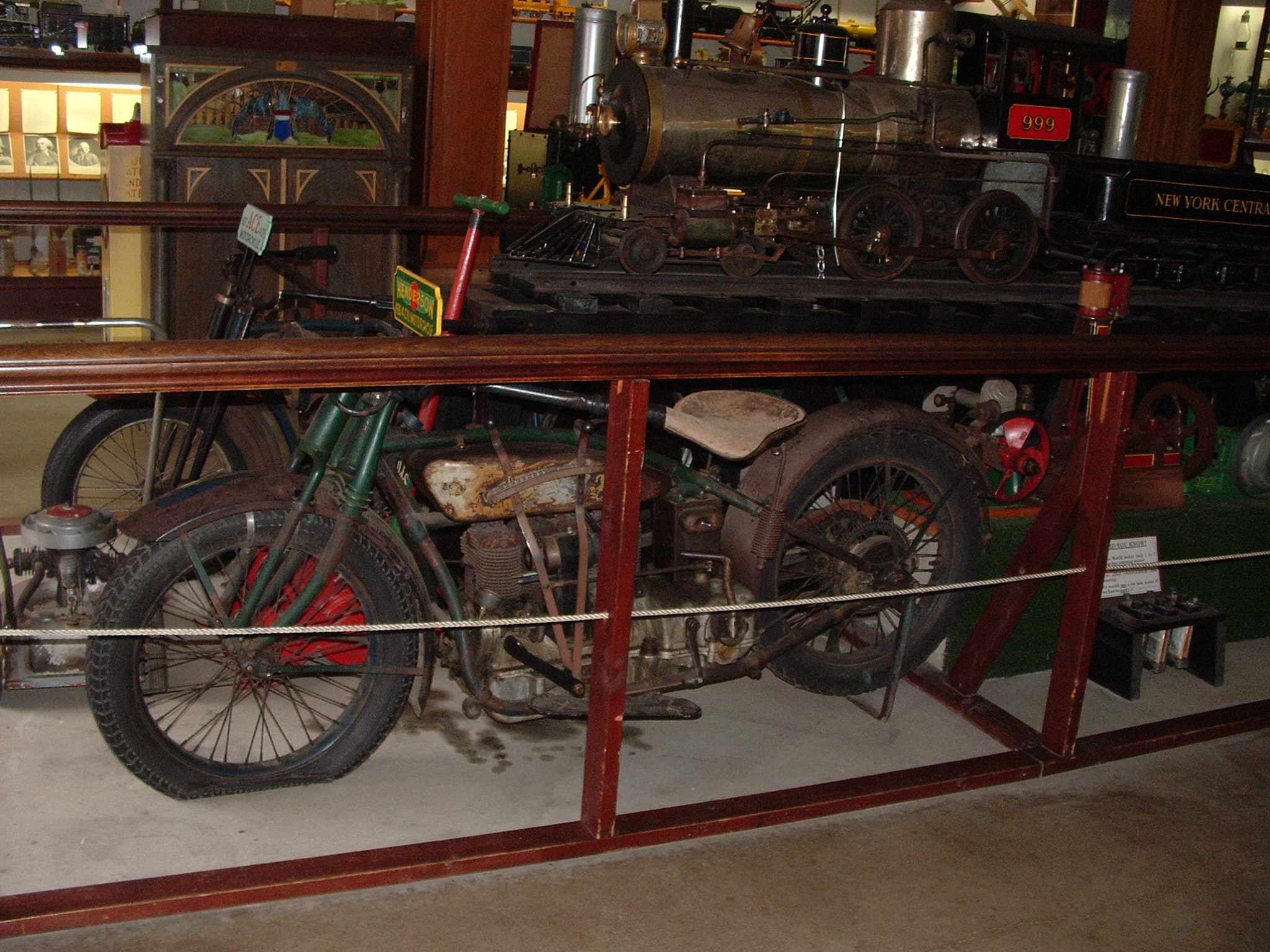
1926 Henderson, on display at Clark's Trading Post, Lincoln, New Hampshire

The frame was redesigned with a downward slope to the rear for a lower centre of gravity. This enabled the fitting of a shorter, wider, 4 United States gallon (15 litre) fuel tank. Three ring alloy pistons were now standard, the cylinders and camshaft were changed, low and reverse gear ratios were altered and it was fitted with larger 3.85 inch tyres.

==== 1927 DeLuxe ====
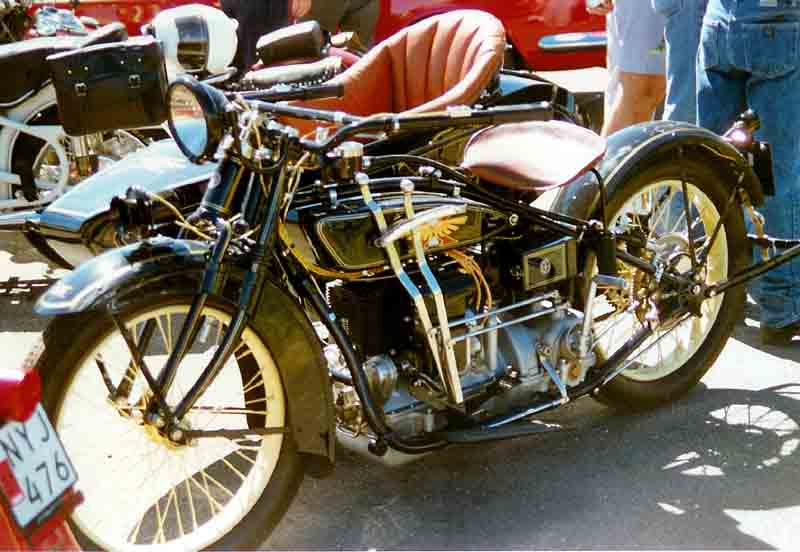
Henderson De Luxe 1300 cc SV 1927

The 1927 DeLuxe featured machined and polished "Ricardo" cylinder-heads and developed 35 hp at 3,800 rpm. The clutch was strengthened with two extra plates. There was a new tank top instrument cluster, featuring speedometer, ammeter, oil pressure gauge and a headlight switch. There were new valve spring covers and an updated Zenith carburetor.

On January 27, 1927, the Indian Motorcycle Company purchased the Ace Motor Corporation. Arthur Lemon moved to Indian, where the Ace was to become the Indian Four.

==== 1928 The Last DeLuxe ====
The 1928 DeLuxe engine had higher compression, and hardened, polished steel valve guides. The front end was changed to leading link forks and a front brake was added. The wheels were also changed to drop center rims (may have happened mid year).

=== Arthur Constantine ===
In June 1928, Schwinn approached Arthur Constantine from Harley-Davidson, to become Chief Engineer. Constantine looked at the existing model, and embarked on a redesign.

==== 1929 Henderson Streamline Model ====
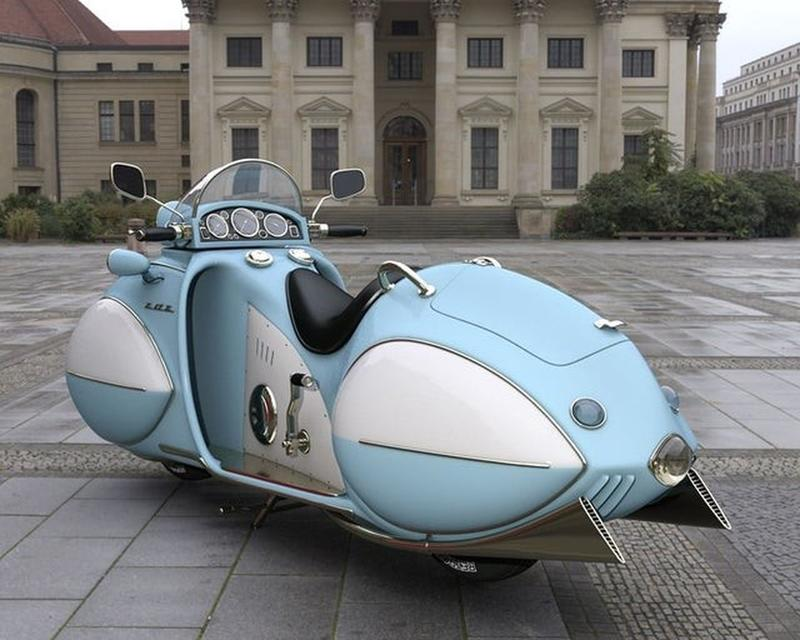
1930 modified KJ.

The Streamline model, commonly called the "KJ", appeared in 1929, and featured improved cooling and a return to the IOE (inlet over exhaust) valve configuration, gave 40 bhp @ 4000 rpm. It had a five main bearing crankshaft, and down draft carburetion. Advertisements boasted of "57 New Features". The Streamline was fast - capable of a genuine 100 mph (160 km/h), and advanced for its time, with such features as leading-link forks and an illuminated speedometer built into the fuel tank.

The Streamline model was produced from 1929 until 1931, and sold for $435.

Image is a CAD Graphic, not the actual "KJ."

On Black Tuesday, October 29, 1929, the Wall Street stock market crashed, but Henderson sales remained strong, and business continued. At this point Excelsior Motor Mfg. & Supply Co. was one of America's "Big Three" of motorcycle production, alongside Harley-Davidson and Indian.

==== 1930 Henderson "Special" KL ====
On April 29, 1930, the new Henderson "Special" KL solo was demonstrated on a new, smooth concrete Illinois highway. Joe Petrali achieved 116.12 mph and 109.09 mph on two recorded runs, averaging 112.61. The higher compression two-ring pistons, and an enlarged 1.25 inch (32 mm) carburetor, meant the KL engine produced 45 hp at 4,500 rpm. The KL was remarkably flexible in top gear, pulling smoothly from 8 to 110 mph. They were even more popular with police departments in the United States.

The "Special" (KL) model was priced $30 more than the regular KJ model, and was available in 1930 and 1931.

=== An unusual end ===
The summer of 1931 saw Schwinn call his department heads together for a meeting at Excelsior. He bluntly told them, with no prior indication, "Gentlemen, today we stop." Schwinn felt that the Depression could easily continue for eight years, and even worsen. Despite the full order book, he had chosen to pare back his business commitments to the core business, bicycle manufacture. By September 1931 it was all over.

==== Revival ====
In 1993, Dan Hanlon secured the rights to the Excelsior-Henderson trademarks and founded the Excelsior-Henderson Motorcycle Company in Belle Plaine, Minnesota. The company designed and built nearly 2000 Super-X motorcycles, powered by a 1386 cc v-twin engine between 1998 and 2000, before the company succumbed to the financial turmoil in the marketplace.

==== Barnard cyclecar ====
The Barnard cyclecar, manufactured in London by the St Mark's Engineering Co in 1921–22, used a 1169cc Henderson engine, which was possibly procured as surplus equipment after the end of World War 1.

== See also ==
- List of motorcycle manufacturers
- List of motorcycles of the 1910s
- List of motorcycles of the 1920s
