= Ignaz Schwinn =

Founder of Schwinn Bicycle Company

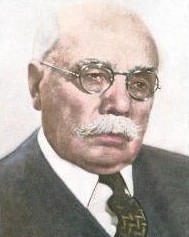
- Born: April 1, 1860; Hardheim, Grand Duchy of Baden
- Died: August 31, 1948 (aged 88); Chicago, Illinois, U.S.
- Burial place: Rosehill Cemetery

Ignaz Schwinn (April 1, 1860 – August 31, 1948) was a German-American bicycle designer, who co-founded, and eventually owned, the Schwinn Bicycle Company.

He was born in the town of Hardheim, Grand Duchy of Baden, in 1860. In his early years, he completed a mechanical apprenticeship, then he became an itinerant bicycle repairman. Schwinn reportedly had a dispute with an early partner in Germany over brake designs and sought his fortune abroad. He arrived in Chicago in 1891 and, by 1895 had teamed with German immigrant Adolph Arnold to found Arnold, Schwinn, and Company. In 1908, Schwinn bought Arnold's interest, becoming sole owner. Ignaz Schwinn maintained the original company name and ran operations through World War II. After this his son Frank succeeded him, the name was changed to the Schwinn Bicycle Company, and the corporation grew to have a nationwide market.

Ignaz Schwinn died of a stroke in Chicago on August 31, 1948, and was buried at Rosehill Cemetery.
