= Brough (surname) =

Brough (pronounced /brʌf/) is a surname. Notable people with the surname include:

- Alan Brough (born 1967), New Zealand-born actor, television and radio host and comedian based in Australia
- Albert Brough (1895–1972), British rugby league and association football player
- Alexander Brough (1863–1940), New York politician
- Andrew Brough, New Zealand musician
- Antonia Brough (1897–1937), British actress
- Arthur Brough (1905–1978), English actor
- Barnabas Brough (c. 1795–1854), British merchant, accountant and playwright
- Bill Brough (born 1966), American politician
- Charles Hillman Brough (1876–1935), American politician
- Clayton Brough (born 1950), American climatologist and teacher
- Danny Brough (born 1983), British rugby player and "Man of Steel" winner
- George Brough (1890–1970), British motorcycle racer and manufacturer
- Fanny Brough (1852–1914), British stage actress
- Harry Brough (1896–1975), English footballer
- Harvey Brough (born 1957), English musician
- James Brough, (1904-1988), British paleontologist and ichthyologist
- Jean Marie Brough, American politician
- Jim Brough (1903–1986), British rugby and association football player
- Joanne Brough (1927–2005), American television producer and executive
- Joel Brough (born 1968), Canadian field hockey player
- Joseph Brough (1886–1968), English footballer
- John Brough (disambiguation), several people
- Jonathan Brough, New Zealand-born film director based in Australia
- Jonathon Brough, New Zealand designer at special effects company Wētā Workshop
- Lionel Brough (1836–1909), British actor and comedian
- Louise Brough (1923–2014), American tennis player
- Mal Brough (born 1961), Australian politician
- Mary Brough (1863–1934), English actress
- Michael Brough (footballer) (born 1981), English footballer
- Michael Brough (game designer) (born 1985), New Zealand video game developer
- Mick Brough (1899–1960), New Zealand rower
- Patrick Brough (born 1996), English footballer
- Paul Brough (conductor) (born 1963), English conductor
- Paul Brough (footballer) (born 1965), English professional footballer
- Peter Brough (1916–1999), English radio ventriloquist
- Robert Barnabas Brough (1828–1860), English poet, novelist and playwright
- Robert Brough (1872–1905), Scottish painter
- Rob Brough (born 1955), Australian journalist, television presenter and rugby league coach
- William Brough (disambiguation), several people
- Zara Cisco Brough (1919–1988), Native American chief
- Zoe Brough (born 2003), English actress

== See also ==
- Jonathan Brugh, New Zealand actor and comedian
