= Brough =

Brough (/brʌf, brɒx/ bruff, brokh) may mean or refer to an area, enclosure, round tower or outer wall of a feudal castle.

== Places ==
=== England ===
- Brough, Cumbria, a village in Cumbria
  - Brough Castle
- Brough-on-Noe, a hamlet in Derbyshire
- Brough, East Riding of Yorkshire, a town
  - Brough Aerodrome, an aerodrome and former motor racing circuit nearby
- Brough with St Giles, a village and civil parish in North Yorkshire
  - Brough Hall
- Brough, Nottinghamshire, a village on the Fosse Way
- Middlesbrough, a town in North Yorkshire

=== Scotland ===
- Brough, Caithness, near Dunnet Head
- Brough, Shetland
- Brough, Yell, Shetland
- Brough of Birsay, a tidal island and lighthouse, Orkney Islands

== Other uses ==
- Brough (surname)
- Brough Motorcycles, made in England from 1908 to 1926
- Brough Superior, a brand of English motorcycles and automobiles were made from 1919 to 1940

== See also ==
- Broch (disambiguation)
