= Proch =

Proch may refer to:

- Polish: proch means "powder" (German: Pulver, Yiddish: פּולווער, romanized: Pulwer (wikt))

== Surnames ==
- Heinrich Proch (1809–1878), 19th century Austrian composer
  - Louise Proch, singer and actress, daughter of Heinrich Proch
- Bolesław Proch (1952–2012), Polish motorcycle speedway rider
- Walter Proch (born 1984), Italian cyclist
- Daniele Proch (born 1996), Italian soccer player

== See also ==
- Broch (disambiguation)
