= Matchless Model X =

Motorcycle produced by Matchless

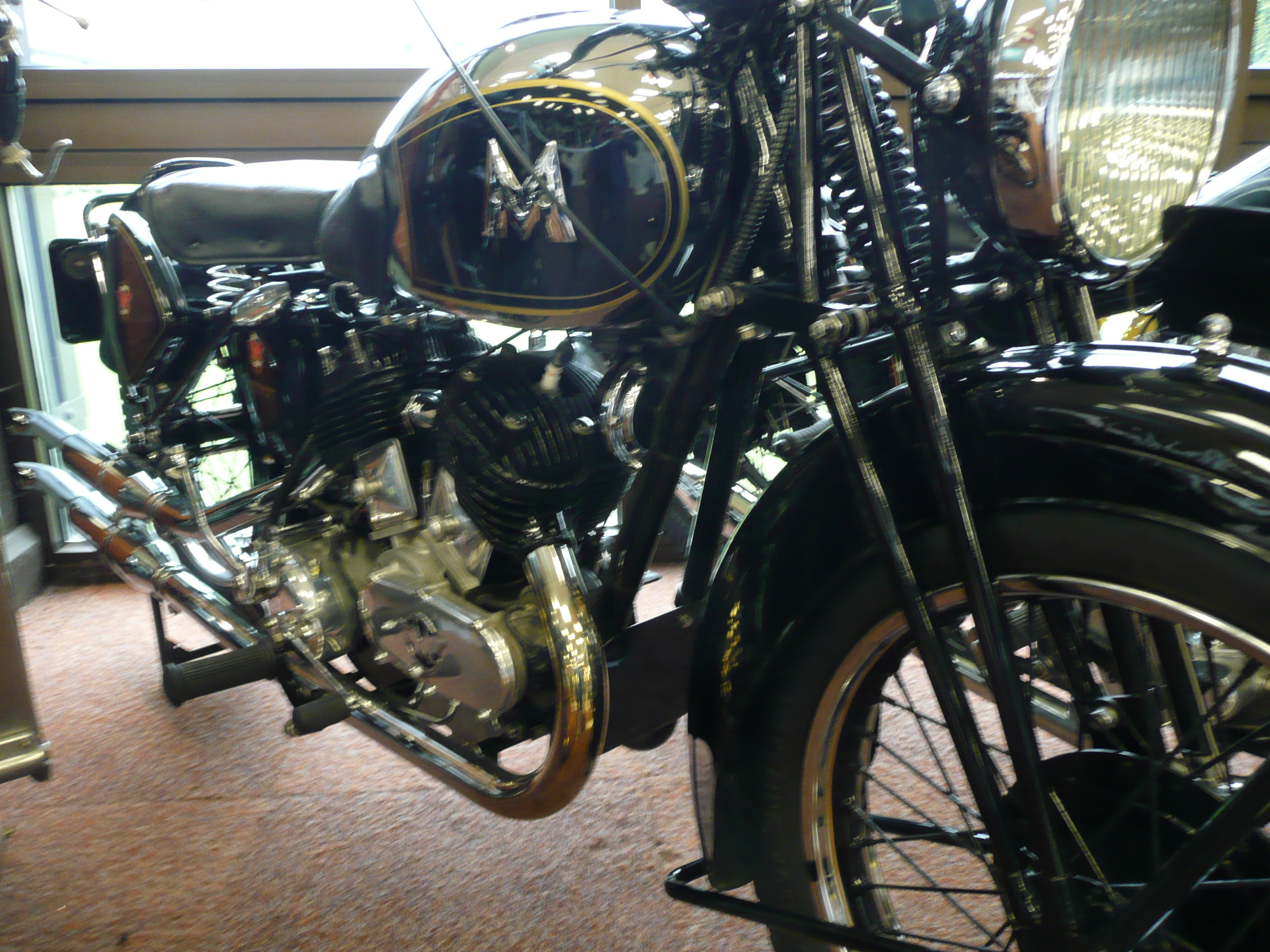
- Manufacturer: Matchless Motor Cycles (Colliers) Ltd, Plumstead Road, London
- Also called: Sports Tourist
- Engine: 990 cc (60 cu in) side-valve V-twin
- Wheelbase: 57 in (1,400 mm)
- Weight: 435 lb (197 kg) (dry)
- Fuel capacity: 2.5 gallons

The Matchless Model X is a Matchless motorcycle made from 1929 to 1940. There were yearly modifications and in 1937 the Model X was completely redesigned as a fast touring motorcycle. Production ended with outbreak of World War II.

== Development ==
The Matchless Model X was developed for V-twin enthusiasts and had a specially reinforced rear frame for heavy-duty sidecar work. At the end of 1936 the Model X was upgraded and rebranded the Sports Tourist, with a shorter wheelbase frame which improved roadholding and steering. The Motor Cycle road tested the Model X in May 1937, and noted that the steering was light but even when cruising at over 60 mph (97 km/h) it did "not become so light as to necessitate-use of the damper." Performance of the 990 cc (60 cu in) engine was described as "delightful" and although not a sportster it was capable of 80 mph (130 km/h) and could reach 70 mph (110 km/h) from a standing start in a quarter of a mile.

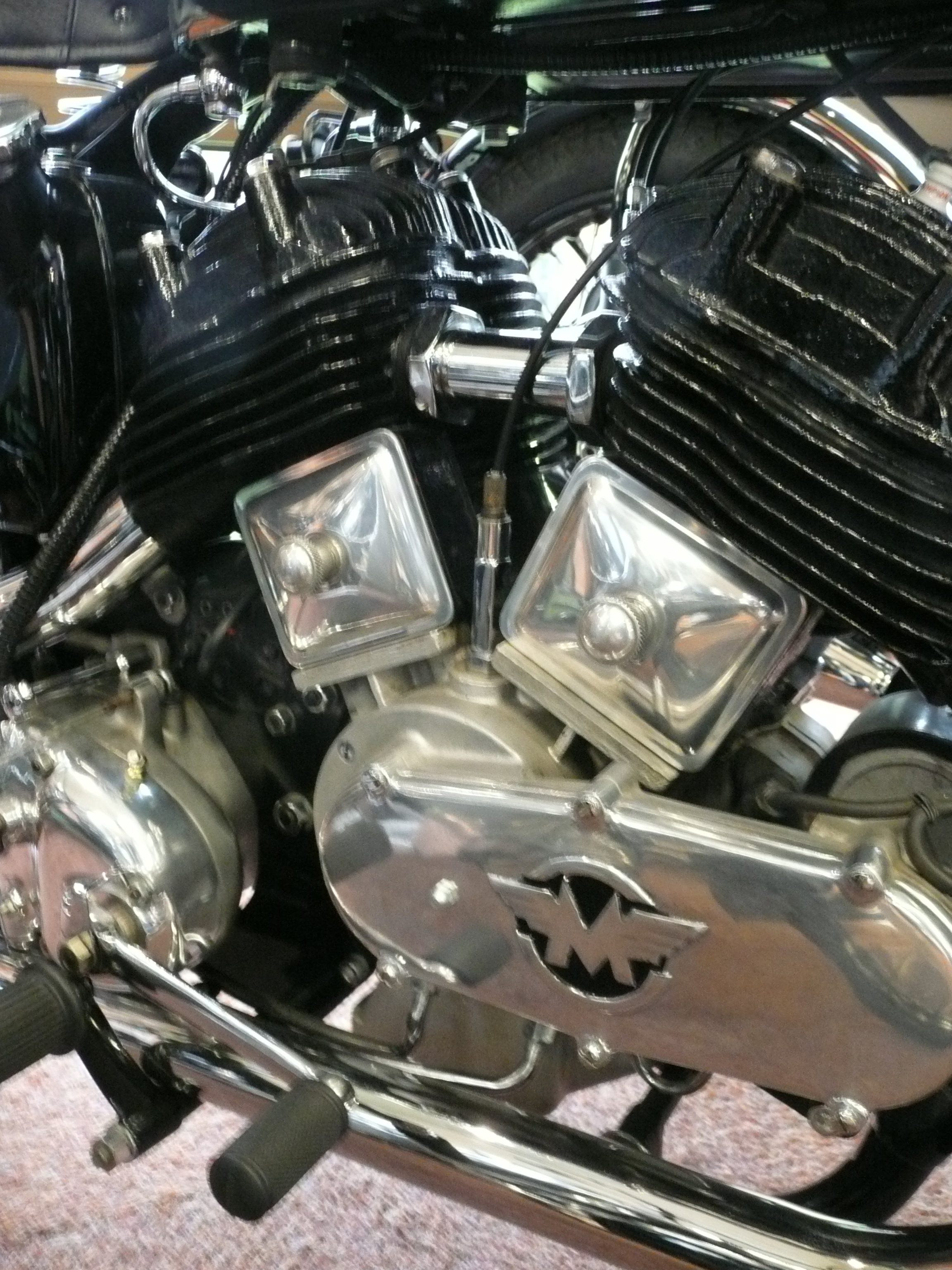
Matchless Model X engine

== Brough Superior ==
In the lead up to World War II Brough Superior began using 990 cc Matchless V-twin side valve engines for their SS80 and overhead-valve engines for the SS100.
