= Brough Superior Golden Dream =

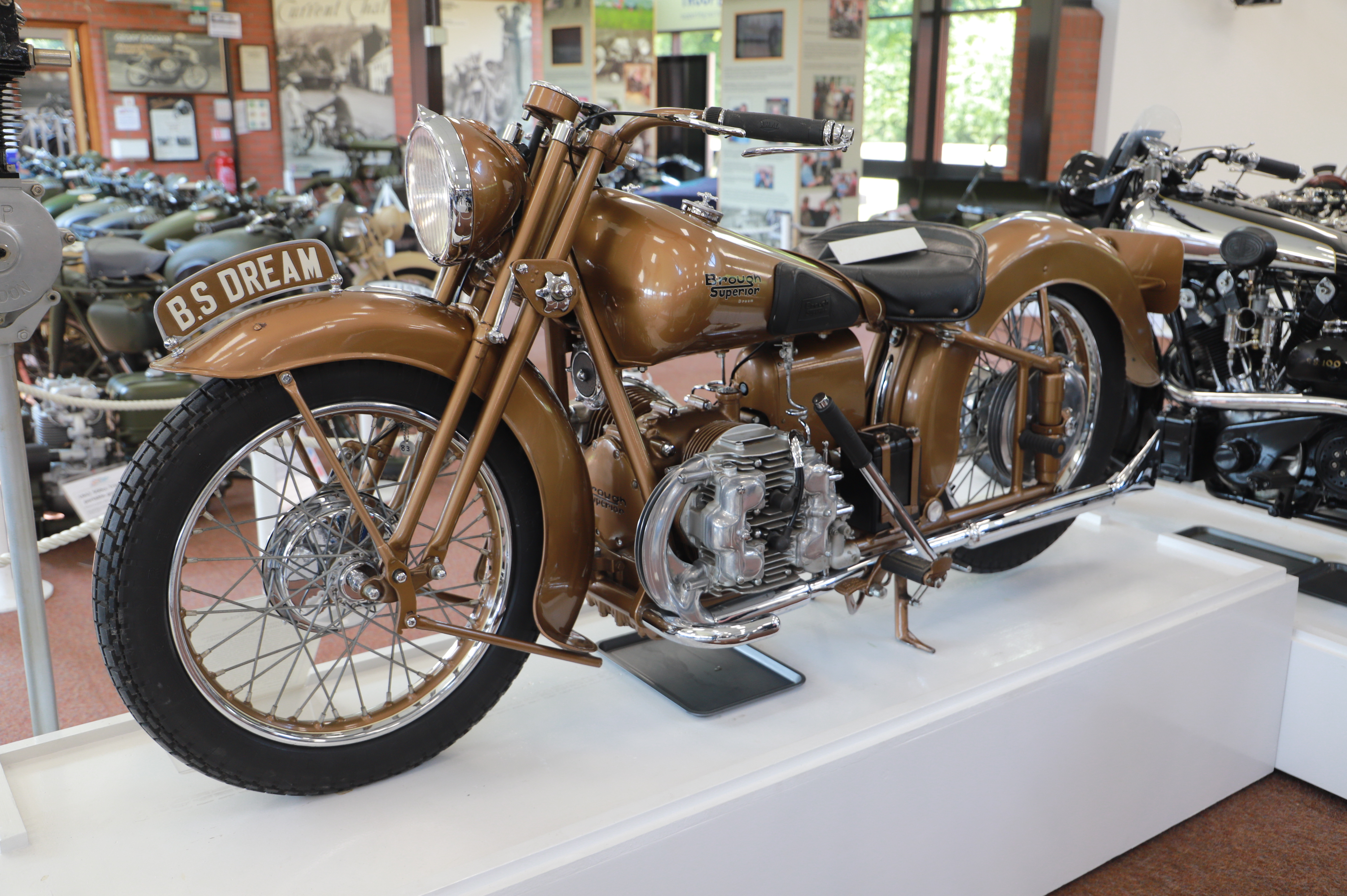
- Manufacturer: George Brough Ltd, Haydn Road, Nottingham, England
- Production: 1938–1939
- Engine: 996 cc Four cylinder (doubly opposed) OHV
- Wheelbase: 1,500 mm (58 in)
- Fuel capacity: 4.5 imp gal (20 L; 5.4 US gal)

The Brough Superior Golden Dream was designed and built by George Brough in Nottingham, England, in 1938. With its distinctive gold finish, this was to be the ultimate Brough Superior but production was stopped by the outbreak of War in 1939.

== Development ==
Animation of the engine (not to scale)

Designed as a team effort by Brough, 'Ike' Hatch, and Freddie Dixon, the engine has two horizontally opposed flat twins one above the other and geared together, thus rotating counter to each other forming an H engine. Connecting rods from opposed cylinders were of the fork and blade type and thus shared a common crank pin. All pistons moved in unison, that is to the left or to the right at the same time. The pistons could thus be counterweighted 100% yielding a perfect balance. Primary, secondary and higher-order sources of vibration canceled each other, as did the gyroscopic effects from each crankshaft.

George Brough described it a "flat vertical" engine. The four cylinders were 68 mm × 68 mm (2.7 in × 2.7 in) equating to 988 cc, with the camshafts gear-driven. Further development work was done on the engine, reconfiguring it as 71 mm × 63 mm (2.8 in × 2.5 in) (998cc), with chain-driven camshafts.

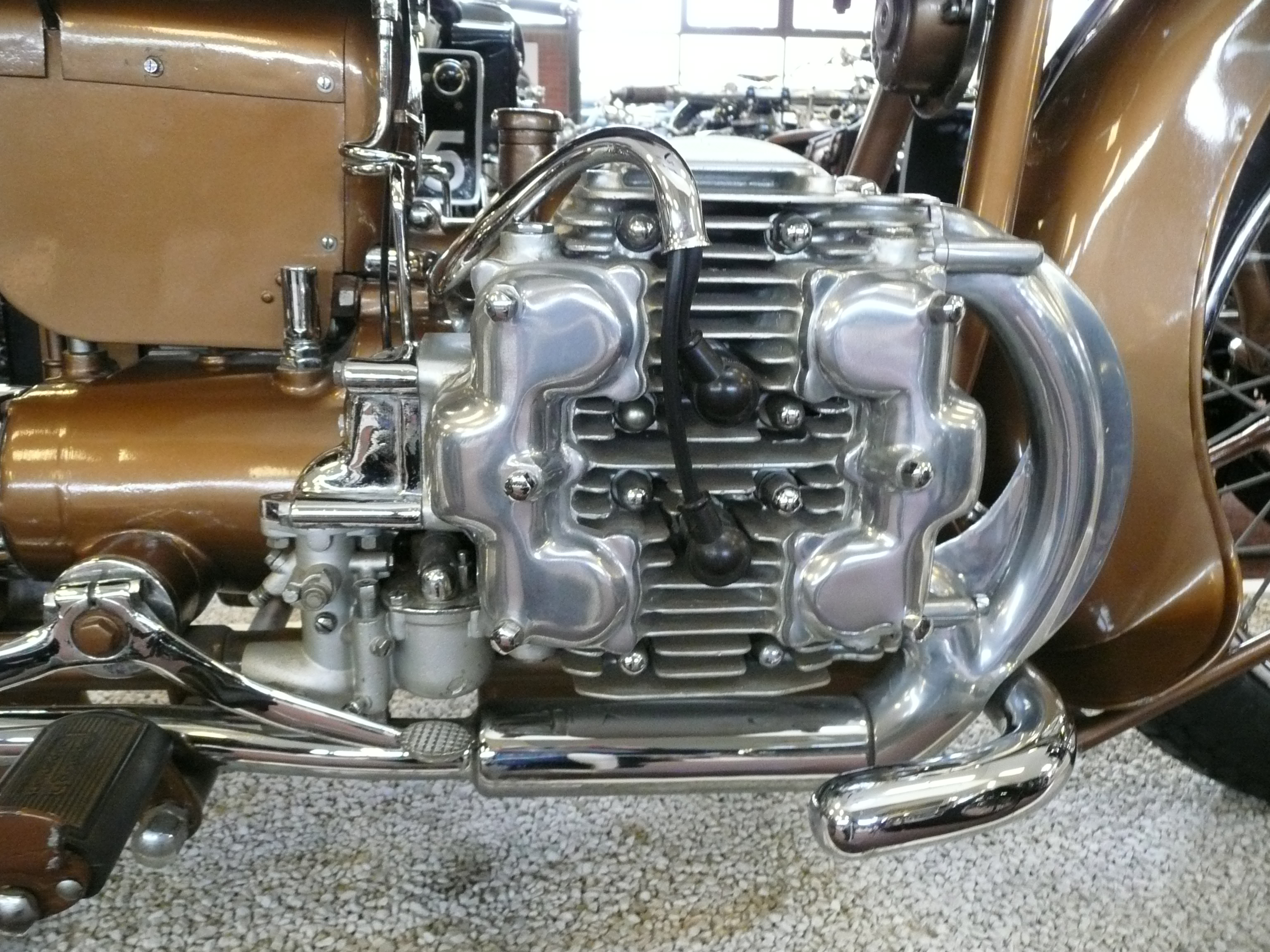
Golden Dream engine

The engine was a four stroke engine.

The frame was designed to accommodate the unusual engine and was welded together with a fully sprung plunger type springing for the rear wheel, unlike the cantilever swingarm suspension on the Brough Superior SS100. The forks were Brough Superior's "Castle" forks derived from a Harley-Davidson design, and many components such as the petrol tank, saddle and wheels were the same as standard Brough Superior machines.

The Dream had optional three or four speed transmission, manufactured to Brough's own design by David Brown Ltd. of Huddersfield. The final shaft drive had an underslung worm and pinion gear on the rear axle and the propeller shaft was enclosed in a tube.

== Exhibition and pre-production ==
The Golden Dream was exhibited at the Earls Court motorcycle show in London in 1938. Five Golden Dreams were produced during 1939 and another model was planned for exhibition at Olympia; but World War II was declared in September 1939 and the Brough works were turned over to the war effort, making components for Rolls-Royce. Brough Superior never returned to motorcycle production.

== Surviving Golden Dreams ==
At least one Dream is running and is owned by John Wallis (the chairman of the Brough Superior Club, Nottingham, England). Two others are under restoration.

A Brough Superior Dream was on display at the British National Motorcycle Museum. Like many exhibits it was destroyed in a fire in 2003 but has since been largely restored, although it has never run, as there are no internals in the engine or gearbox.

== See also ==
- List of motorcycles by type of engine
