= Brough Superior Austin Four =

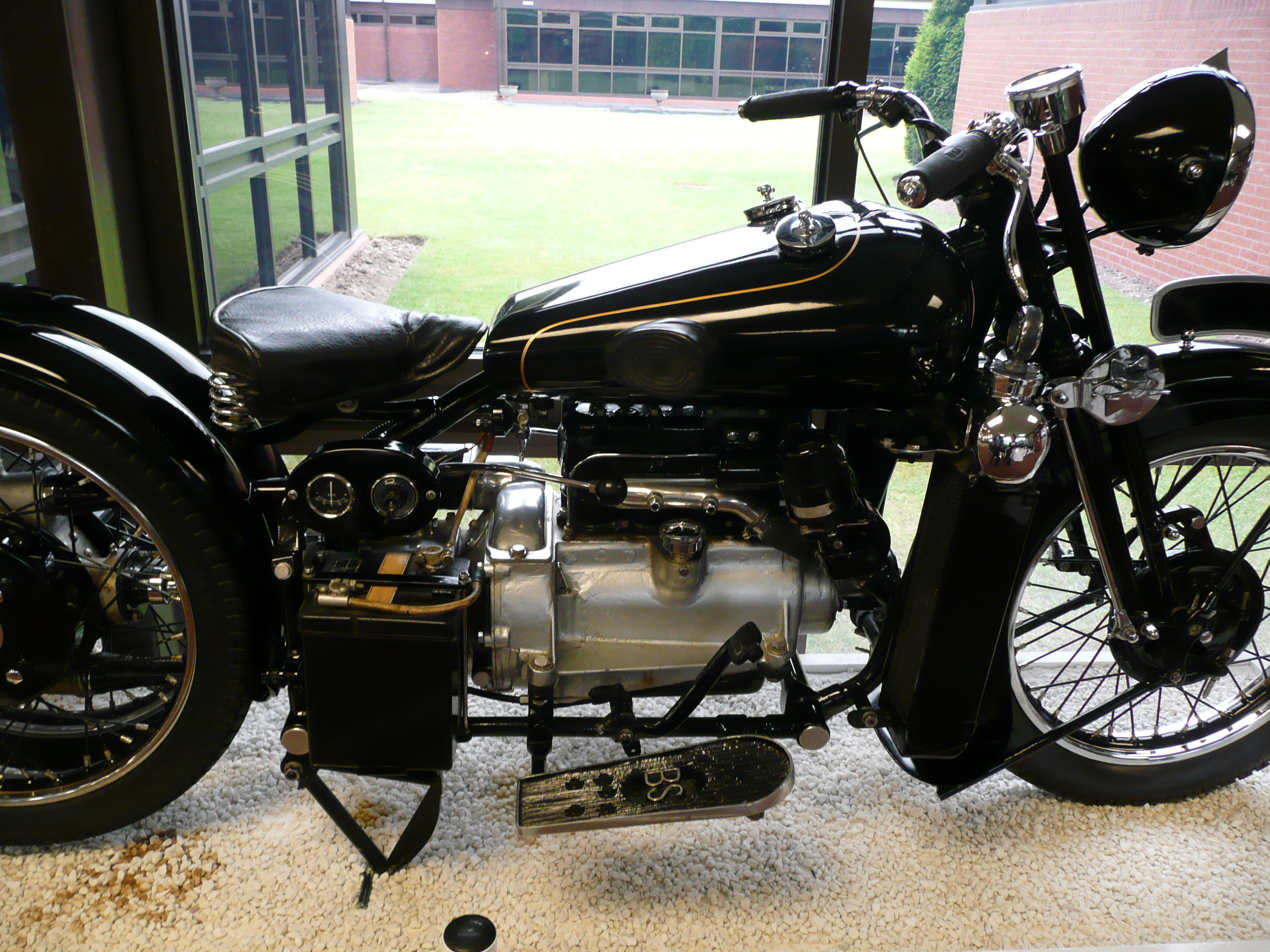
- Manufacturer: Brough Superior
- Production: 1932-1934
- Engine: 797 cc (48.6 cu in) four-cylinder
- Transmission: shaft drive
- Wheelbase: 1,510 mm (59.5 in)
- Weight: 230 kg (510 lb) (dry)

The Brough Superior Austin Four was a limited-production motorcycle designed and manufactured by Brough Superior of Nottingham, UK in 1932. It was listed in the 1932 Brough Superior catalogue as the 'Straight Four' but it was commonly known as the Brough Superior Austin Four, or BS4, or '3-wheeled Brough'. The machine is unique in its design, being powered by a modified Austin 7 automobile engine and gearbox unit, from which a driveshaft emerges on the centre-line of the motor. Rather than design a new gearbox, George Brough had the inspiration to keep the central driveshaft, and use a pair of close-couple rear wheels driven by a central final drive box. This 3-wheeled design was legally considered a motorcycle as the wheel centres were within 24". The Brough Superior-Austin Four created a sensation when revealed at the 1931 Olympia Motorcycle Show.

== Development ==
George Brough considered the four-cylinder engine ideal for a motorcycle, given its smooth running and potential for greater horsepower than a single or twin-cylinder engine of the same capacity. Brough Superior had already revealed two prototype 4-cylinder machines before 1932, using an air-cooled sidevalve V-4 built in-house (1927), and an air-cooled inline sidevalve 4 developed by Motosacoche (1928). While these prototypes were never built in series, they generated tremendous attention at shows and in the press. In 1930, George Brough considered using an engine already in production, in this case the well-developed Austin 4-cylinder sidevalve, water-cooled motor of 747cc. Brough increased the engine displacement by 50 cc to 797 cc and added a light alloy 'sports' cylinder head for more horsepower. George Brough claimed a significant increase in the Austin's power output, but, as The Motor Cycle magazine observed, this was a luxury motorcycle intended for use with a sidecar, not a sports machine. Power output was actually quite low, and the performance was inhibited by the use of standard Austin rear-axle ratios. The brisk acceleration with a heavy sidecar fitted would, however, more than compensate for lack of top speed.

On sale from March 1932, the Brough Superior Four had been in development for 18 months and brought much needed publicity to the Brough works as the Depression struck the motorcycle industry worldwide. Despite the attention, however, only ten examples were actually built. Initially designed for use with a sidecar, the Austin engine was from a well-proven Austin 7 design, which was a side-valve with a low-pressure oiling system. George Brough chose to use also the standard Austin 7 three-speed gearbox, complete with reverse, driving a prop shaft to a crown wheel and pinion mounted in a specially cast housing. The twin rear wheels would possibly have been expected to make it difficult to handle, but Hubert Chantrey successfully completed the Land's End Trial on a solo version. Chantry pointed out that it really was a luxury motorcycle, as it had cost George Brough over £1,000 to develop (which equates to over £50,000 today.) The Brough Superior Four was actually sold for £188 - cheaper than the Brough Superior SS100.

Engine cooling was achieved with a pair of radiators fixed either side of the front frame downtube. The Brough Superior-Austin Four's success was the publicity generated by the introduction and different marketing of such an unconventional motorcycle.

== Surviving examples ==
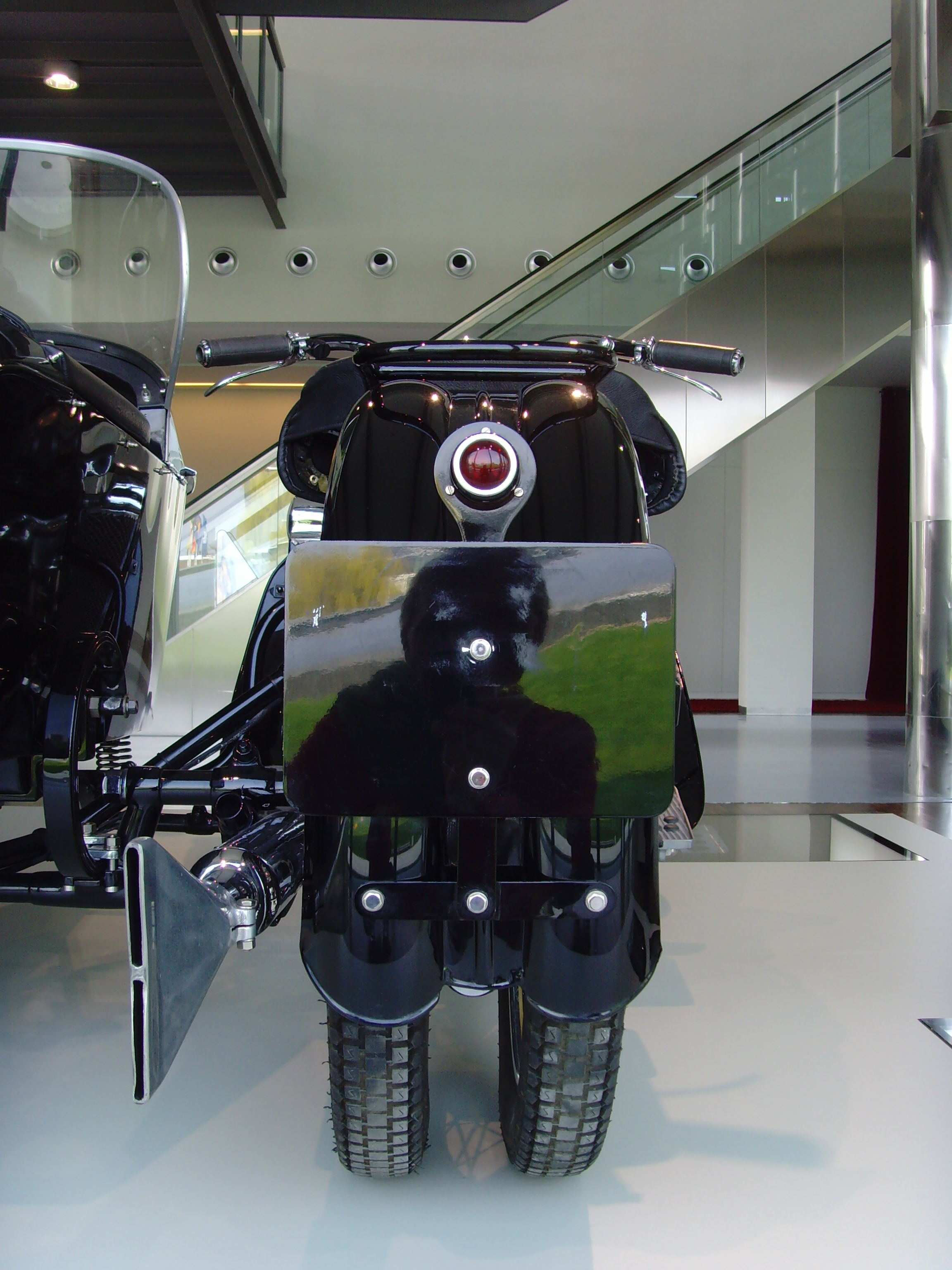
The unusual twin rear wheel layout allows room for the wheels to be driven by the standard Austin prop shaft.

Of the ten Brough Superior Austin Fours built, (eight in 1932 and one in both 1933 and 1934), a total of nine have survived to this day. Of these, two are in the US, three are owned by UK enthusiasts, two are in Germany, and one is known to have been scrapped in Anglesey, Wales. One is at the Southward Car Museum in Otaihanga on New Zealand's North Island. Recently the ninth surviving model has been discovered in the collection of the late Frank Vague near Bodmin, Cornwall. One was also exhibited at the 1000 Bike Show of 2026 in South Africa near Johannesburg.

== Brough Superior Austin Four in the UK Motorcycle Museum ==
The Brough Superior Austin Four in the National Motorcycle Museum (UK) is actually a replica of the motorcycle that was scrapped in Wales. Built by enthusiast Albert Wallis, who started with a few spare parts including a rear bevel box casting, and a pair of original radiators, it was completed with a standard Austin 7 engine and gearbox.

== See also ==
- List of motorized trikes
- Cyclecars
