= Brough Superior SS80 =

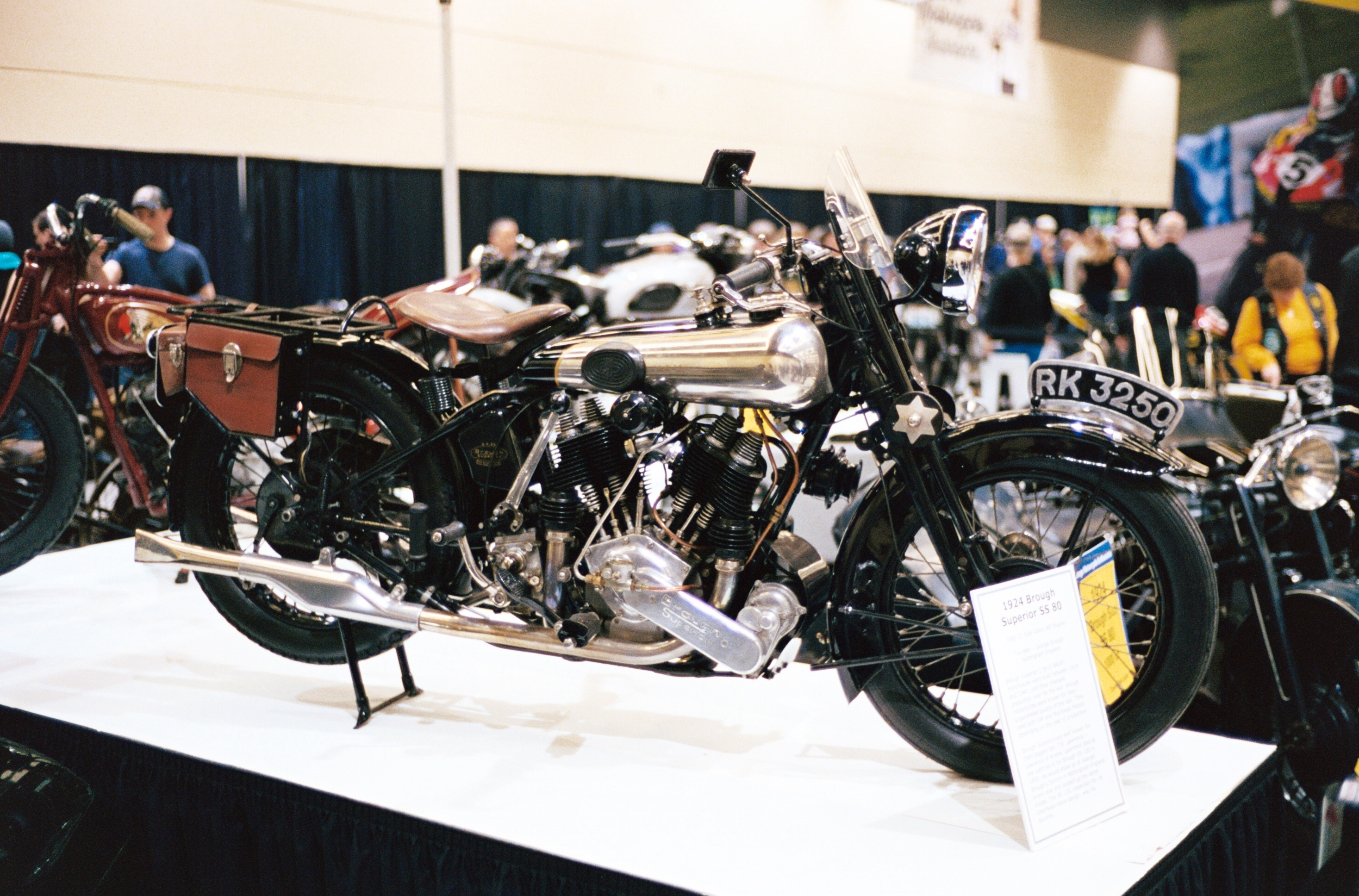
- Manufacturer: Brough Superior
- Production: 1922 to 1939
- Engine: 990 cc 50 degree V-twin

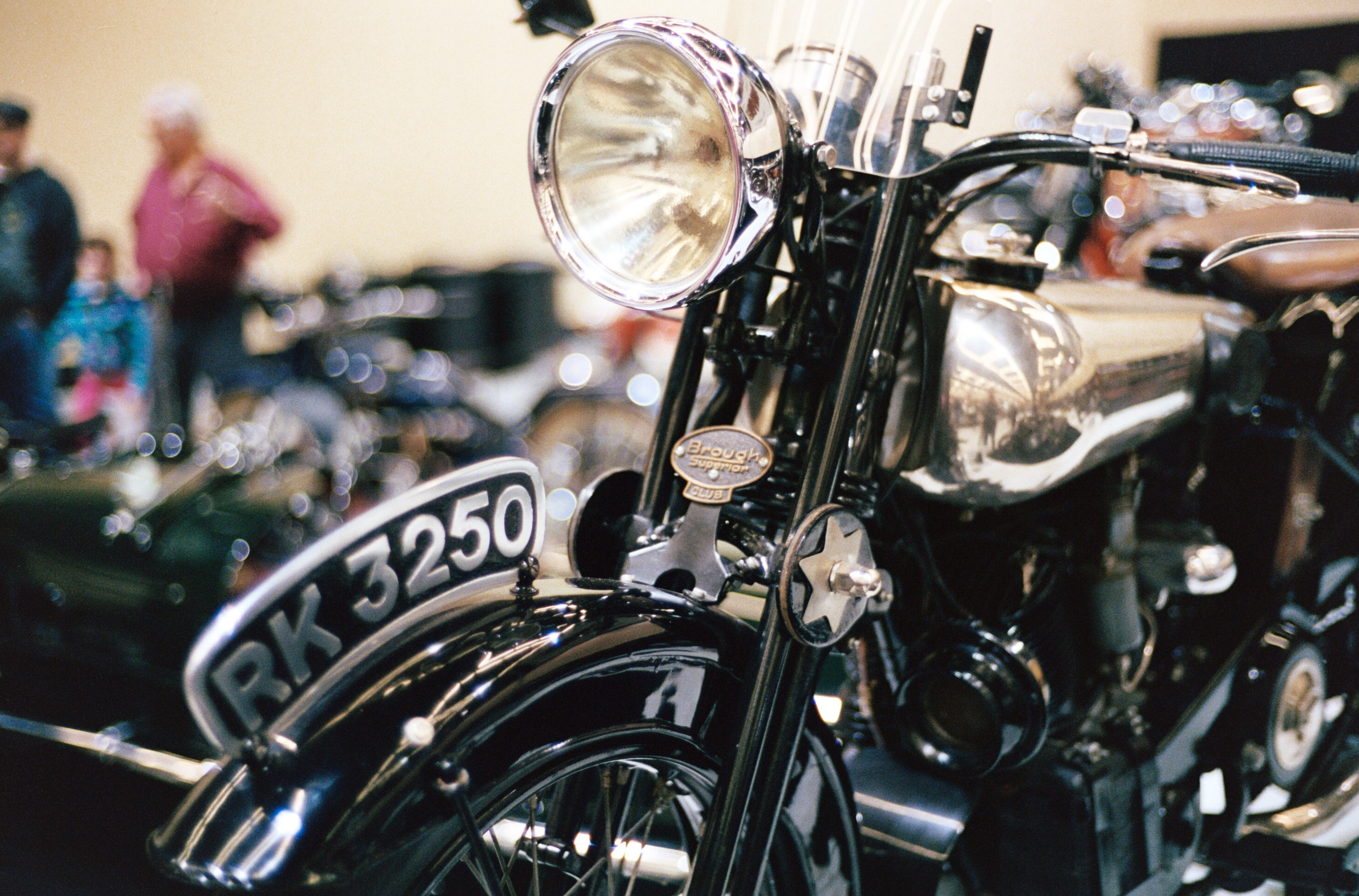
A 1924 Brough Superior SS80 from a Vintage Motorcycle Enthusiasts collector, at the 2014 Seattle International Motorcycle Show.

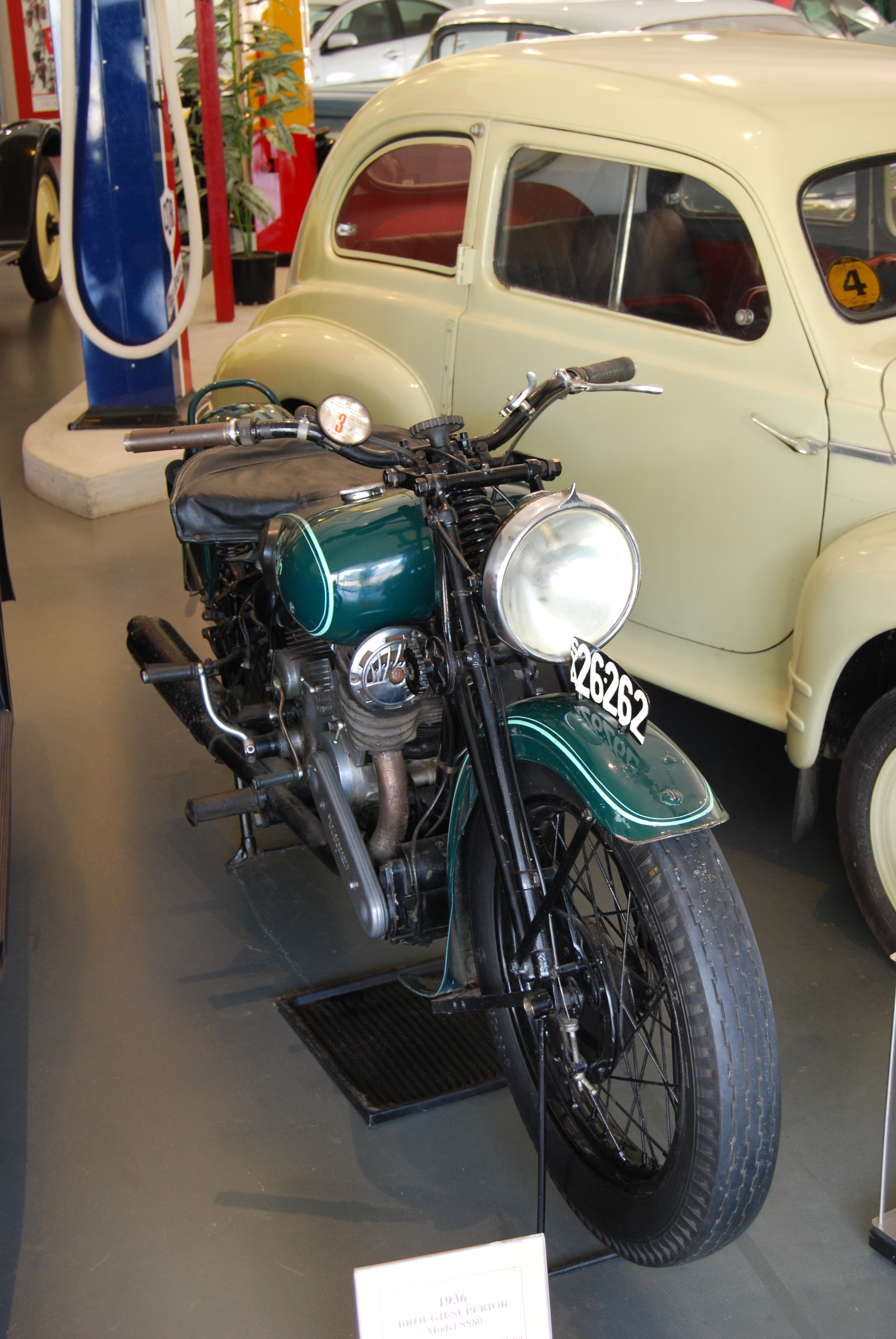

The Brough Superior SS80 was a motorcycle designed and built by George Brough of Brough Superior in Nottingham, UK from 1922 to 1939. Described by The Motor Cycle as "The Rolls-Royce of Motor Cycles", production ended with the outbreak of World War II in 1939.

== Development ==
The SS80 (Super Sports) model was developed in 1920, soon after George Brough set up Brough Superior. The SS80's model designation was based on Brough's guarantee that it could reach 80 mph (130 km/h). Finished to a standard that put it well beyond the reach of most motorcyclists, the SS80 set out the key features of all Brough Superior models to follow. Thirty-two SS80s were built in 1935. Early models used the 988 cc (60.3 cu in) J.A.P. sidevalve engine which was expected to be superseded by the overhead valve Brough Superior SS100 when it was introduced at the end of 1924, but SS80 sales continued well and in 1935 the SS80 was fitted with the 982 cc (59.9 cu in) Matchless V-twin engine, similar to the one fitted to the Matchless Model X but with Brough's modified big end arrangement. Before production ended with the outbreak of World War II in 1939, 1,086 SS80's were manufactured in total, of which 460 were Matchless-engined.

== SS80 De Luxe ==
The SS80 "De Luxe" specification included a fully sprung rear wheel, bottom link front forks, a patented rolling stand, pillion footrests and a specially tuned engine.

== Racing success ==
George Brough used a specially-tuned SS80 he initially nicknamed 'Spit and Polish' (so called because of the immaculate finish he always maintained) to become the first sidevalver to lap the Brooklands track at over 100 miles per hour (161 km/h). The same motorcycle, later known as "Old Bill", went on to win 51 out of 52 races. The only time it failed to win was due to a puncture as it crossed the finish line, George and the bike crossing the line separately.

Brough became famous as a competition rider and only retired from racing following a serious crash which left him recovering for eight months in hospital receiving skin grafts, as he never wore protective clothing.
