= Aston Martin AMB 001 =

Limited edition sport motorcycle

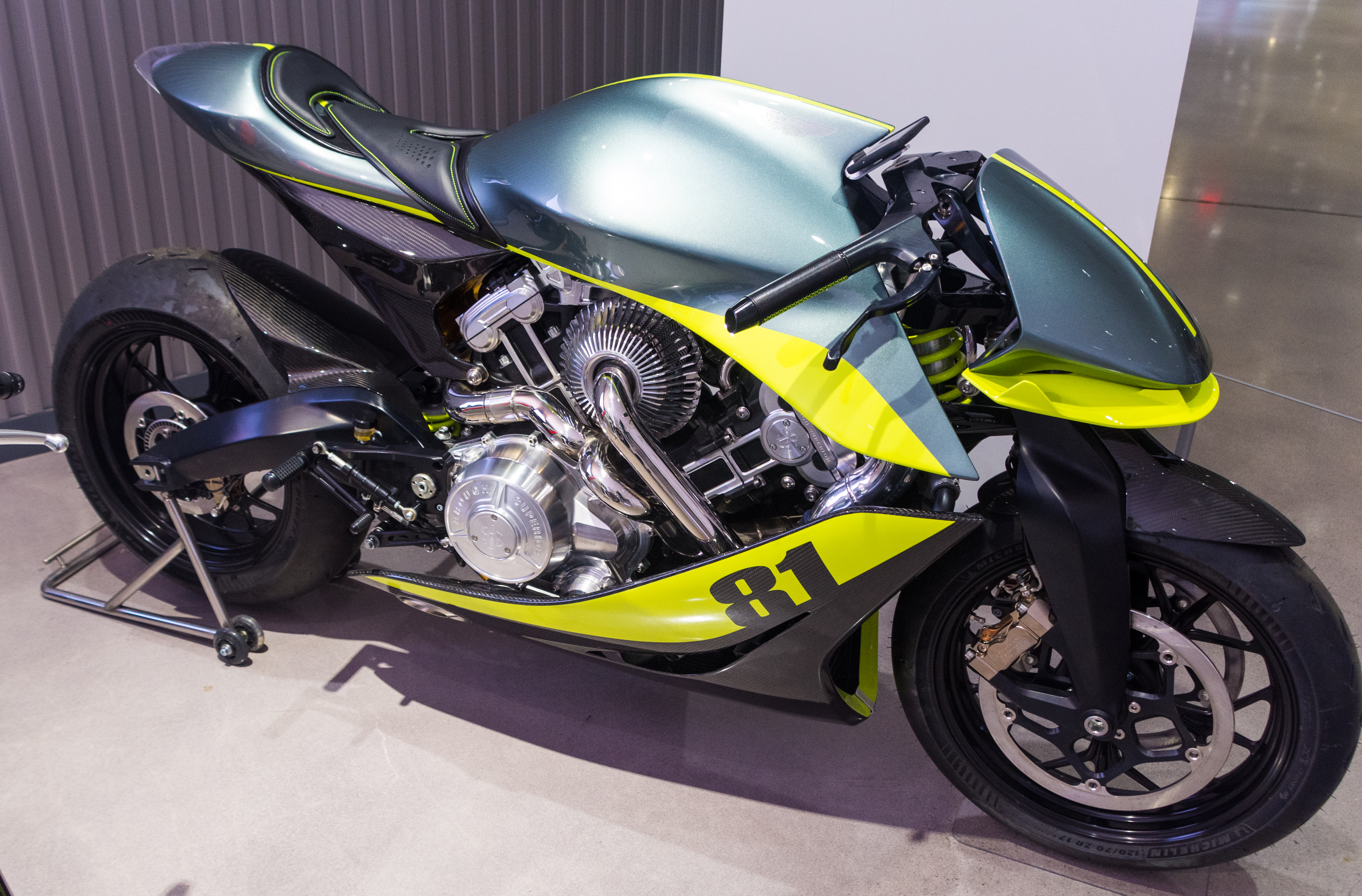
- Manufacturer: Aston Martin
- Class: sport bike
- Engine: 997 cc (60.8 cu in) V-twin
- Power: 180 hp (130 kW)
- Weight: 180 kg (400 lb) (dry)

The Aston Martin AMB 001 is a sport motorcycle produced by the British manufacturer Aston Martin from 2020. It is Aston Martin's first motorcycle.

== Presentation ==
The AMB 001, presented in November 2019, is produced in a limited series of one hundred examples in Toulouse, France by the motorcycle manufacturer Brough Superior. It is sold at a price of €108000, which makes it the entry-level model of the English luxury brand.

== Technical characteristics ==
It uses a structure in carbon fiber and titanium, a double wishbone fork and it is coated with a painting "Stirling Green" typical of the brand. The two-wheeled AMB 001 receives a V-twin of 997 cc turbocharged with a power of 180 hp.
