= Paul Brough =

Paul Brough may refer to:

- Paul Brough (conductor) (born 1963), English conductor
- Paul Brough (footballer) (born 1965), English professional footballer
