= John Brough (disambiguation) =

John Brough (1811–1865) was an American politician, who served as Governor of Ohio.

John Brough may also refer to:

- John Brough, New Zealand actor, father of director Jonathan Brough
- John B. Brough (born 1941), American philosopher
- John Brough (orientalist) (1917–1984), Scottish scholar of Sanskrit
- John Brough (English footballer) (born 1973), English footballer (Hereford United, Cheltenham Town)
- John Brough (Scottish footballer) (born 1960), Scottish footballer (Heart of Midlothian, Partick Thistle)
- John Cargill Brough (1834–1872), British science writer, lecturer, editor and librarian
