= William Brough =

William Brough may refer to:

- William Brough (priest) (died 1671), English royalist churchman
- William Brough (writer) (1826–1870), English writer
- William Edward Brough, of Brough Motorcycles
- Bill Brough (born 1966), California politician
