= Montgomery Motorcycles =

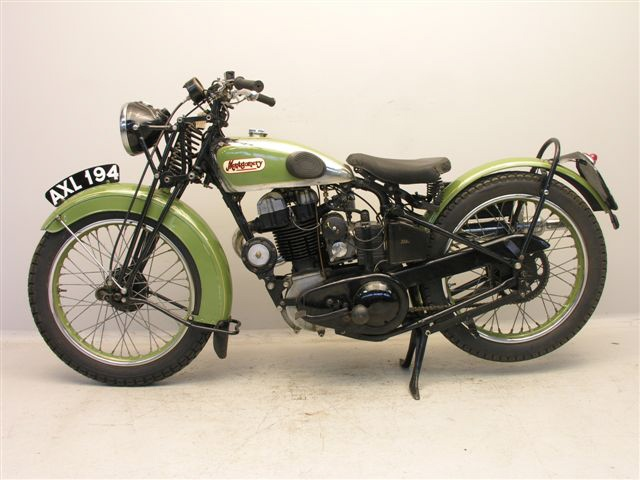
- Industry: Manufacturing and engineering
- Founded: 1913
- Defunct: 1939
- Fate: Wound up at outbreak of the Second World War
- Headquarters: Coventry, UK
- Key people: William Montgomery
- Products: Motorcycles and sidecars

Montgomery Motorcycles was a pioneering British motorcycle manufacturer. Originally based in Bury St Edmunds, Suffolk, following the First World War manufacturing was moved to Coventry. Its founder William Montgomery was an innovator and is credited with the invention of the sidecar. Like Brough, Montgomery made use of the best proprietary components from other specialist companies and concentrated on the production of frames and forks in-house - and Montgomery supplied a number of frames and its own sprung fork to George Brough. In an advert from the time, Montgomery claimed "These Montgomery machines are for the men who prefer a distinctive mount in appearance and performance. That extra degree of soundness – those little touches which distinguish the 'super' machine from the mere motorcycle, come naturally to the Montgomery and at a price that is amazingly low."

== History ==
The first bike from Montgomery Motorcycles was a flat twin produced in 1913 with a Morton and Weaver engine. The First World War halted production, which did not resume until 1922 in Coventry. William Montgomery continued to experiment with sidecar design and actually competed himself in the 1923 Isle of Man TT sidecar race. The entire Montgomery works was destroyed by fire in 1925 but were able to eventually recover and by 1930 were a leading producer of quality two-stroke and four-stroke motorcycles. The top of the range was the Greyhound, finished in a special grey enamel paint. The Second World War brought an end to all production and Montgomery ceased trading in 1939.Andrew Montgomery now owns the trademark for Montgomery and Montgomery Motorcycles

== Models ==
Model	Year	Notes
Montgomery Anzani	1924	996 cc 8-valve, 57 degree, V-twin
Montgomery Greyhound	1930	680cc (70 x 88mm) ohv JAP V-twin
Montgomery De Luxe 350 cc	1934	JAP engine
