= Jean Marie Brough =

American politician

Member of the Washington House of Representatives from the 30th district
- In office 1983–1994

Personal details
- Party: Democratic (since 1994)
- Other political affiliations: Republican (until 1994)

Jean Marie Brough was an American politician. She represented District 30 in the Washington House of Representatives, as a Republican from 1983 to 1994. In 1994, she ran as a Democrat for District 30 in the Washington State Senate.
