= Pulver =

Pulver is the German word for powder (from Latin: pulvis, lit. 'dust') and may refer to:

== People ==
- Carmen Pulver (born 1995), Swiss footballer
- David L. Pulver (born 1965), Canadian freelance writer and game designer
- Elsbeth Pulver (1928–2017), Swiss literary critic
- Hans Pulver (1902–1977), Swiss football player
- Jeff Pulver (born 1962), American Internet entrepreneur
- Jens Pulver (born 1974), U.S.-based professional mixed martial artist
- Joseph S. Pulver Sr. (born 1955), American writer
- Lara Pulver (born 1980), English actress
- Lev Pulver (aka Leib Pulver, Leo Pulver, 1883–1970), Russian composer and violinist
- Liselotte Pulver (aka Lilo Pulver, born 1929), Swiss actress
- Max Pulver (1889–1952), Swiss writer of graphology books

== Other uses ==
- Pulver (album), an album by the Swedish band Lifelover

== See also ==
- Ensign Pulver, a 1964 American film
