= Clayton Brough =

American climatologist & teacher (born 1950)

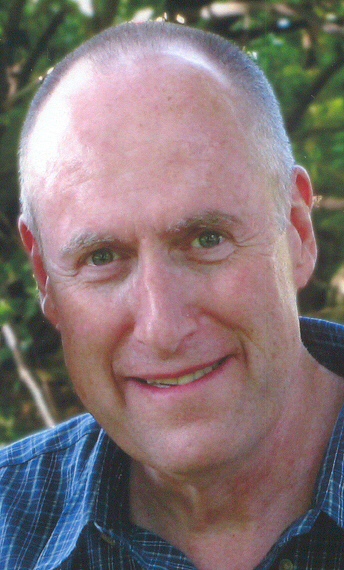
- Born: Robert Clayton Brough; May 29, 1950 (age 76); Los Angeles
- Education: Brigham Young University
- Occupations: Climatologist and Teacher
- Known for: Weatherman for ABC 4

Robert Clayton Brough (born May 29, 1950) is an American climatologist and teacher, best known for his position as a long-time weatherman of KTVX ABC 4 in Salt Lake City, which he held for twenty-eight years. He also worked on the weather team at KUTV. Brough taught middle school for thirty-one years, as well as serving as an Adjunct Instructor at both Brigham Young University and the University of Utah. He is the co-holder of several world records.

== Climatology career ==
Robert Clayton Brough was born on May 29, 1950, in Los Angeles, California. In the mid-1970s, Brough served as executive vice-president of the American Geographical Research Corp. of Utah, where he studied the climate of the region. He began teaching in 1975, but temporarily left the field when in 1978 he became the director of research at WeatherBank Inc. In 1978 Brough also began his career as a member of the television weather team with KUTV in Salt Lake City. In 1980 he moved to KTVX in Salt Lake City, becoming the main weatherman at the station. Then in 1986 he moved to doing weather on the weekends in order to spend more time on his teaching career. Brough retired from ABC 4 in November 2008 after thirty years as a weatherman, which the network celebrated with a retirement tape tribute. Following his retirement he continued working with the Utah Center for Climate and Weather to author reports on the climate history and weather in the state. In April 2015 he performed six public service announcements on cancer detection and prevention for KBYU Television.

== Teaching career ==
While working as an on-air weatherman, Brough also served as a middle school geography, journalism, and science teacher. In December 2005, Brough's students at the Eisenhower Junior High School in Taylorsville, Utah, broke the Guinness World Record for the longest chain of attached straws. The chain consisted of 42,963 individual straws and was 4.57 miles in length. This was the seventh record the school's students achieved with the help of Brough, at the time holding all seven at once. Previous records included the world's longest chain of paper clips reaching 22.17 miles in length built in 2004; the world's largest loaf of bread baked in 1987, weighing 307 lbs; the world's fastest human conveyor belt set in 2005 with the use of 100 student bodies; and the world's longest chain of balloons made in one hour, set in 2005 as well. Brough stated that he believed that the record-breaking attempts taught the children creativity, teamwork, and logistics. Brough was partially inspired to help the children by his own world record attempt, when in 1978 he helped make the world's largest calibrated slide rule, and co-holds the other records with the students.

Brough first taught at Springville Junior High in Springville, Utah, between 1975 and 1978. He returned to teaching at Springville in 1984, before moving to teach at Eisenhower in 1986. Brough also served as an Adjunct Instructor of Geography at Brigham Young University starting in 1989 and at University of Utah beginning in 2005. Brough retired from teaching responsibilities in 2012.

== Publications ==
In the 1980s Brough co-authored Utah's Comprehensive Weather Almanac with Dale Stevens and Dale Jones. In 1996 Brough co-edited and contributed to the book Utah’s Weather and Climate with Dan Pope. In 2003 Brough built the Utah Center for Climate and Weather website with David James, to provide students with information and education about weather in the state. He also authored several other books.

== Personal life ==
As a child and teenager, he was a longtime member of the Boy Scouts of America. In 1967 Brough was selected by his district to report on the status of Scouting in America to US President Lyndon Johnson. He received his BS in Geography and MS in geography from Brigham Young University. As a young man Brough married his wife Ethel, and the birth of his third child made the news when he was born in an ambulance that had stalled on the road. The two had four children together in total. In May 2004 Brough was diagnosed with non-Hodgkin's lymphoma, but the cancer was caught early allowing treatment to go well. He presently serves as the chief genealogist for the Brough Family Organization and is a practicing Mormon and active member of the Church of Jesus Christ of Latter-day Saints.
