= National Motorcycle Museum (UK) =

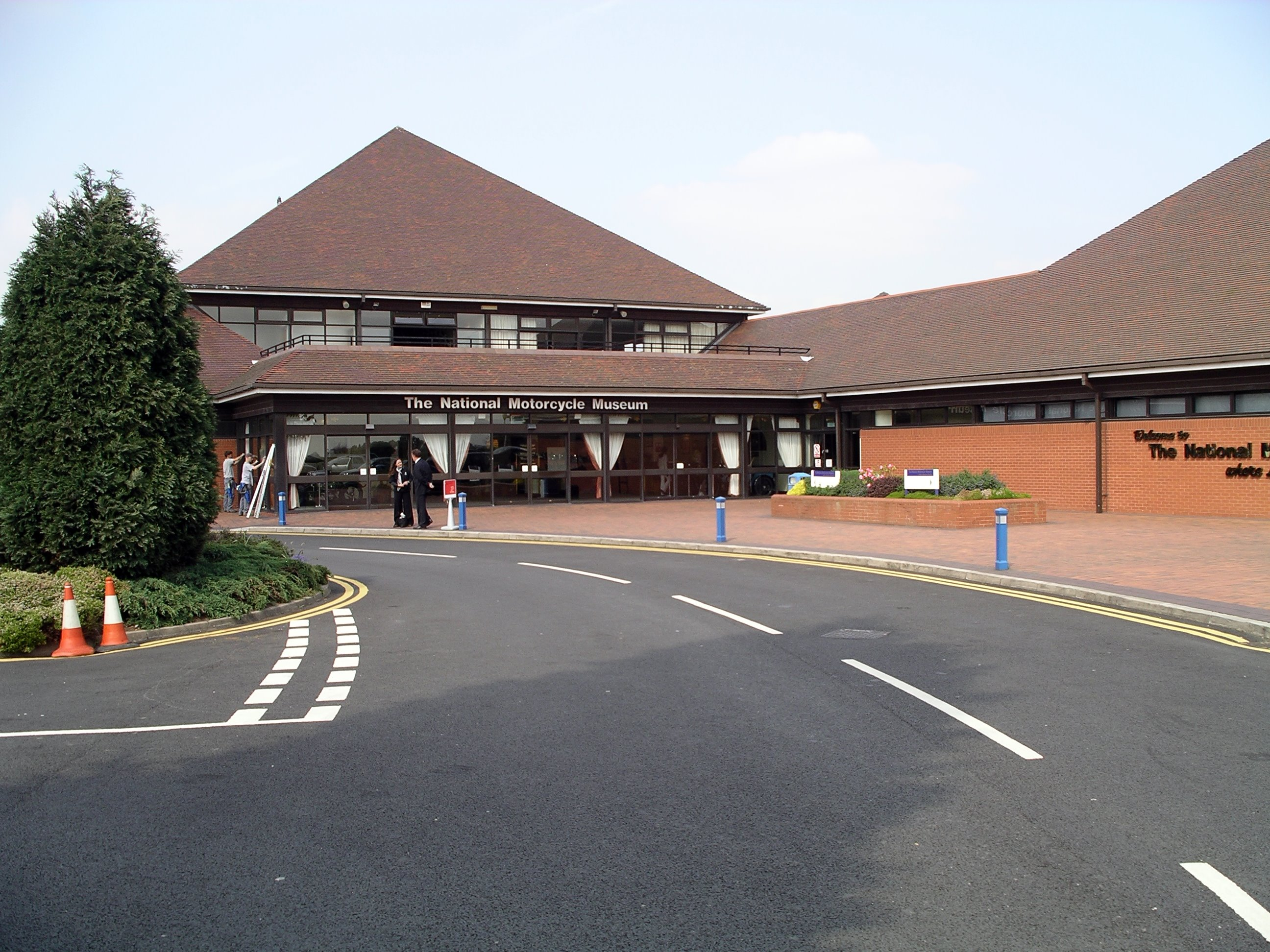
- Established: October 1984
- Location: Solihull; West Midlands; England
- Coordinates: 52.4444°N 1.7069°W
- Type: Motorcycle Museum
- Visitors: 250,000 per year
- Curator: James Hewing
- Website: Official website

The National Motorcycle Museum occupies an 8-acre (32,000 m2) site in Bickenhill, Solihull, England and holds the world's largest collection of British motorcycles. In addition to over 1,000 motorcycles, which cover a century of motorcycle manufacture, the museum developed award-winning conference facilities (The National Conference Centre) in 1985. It is located close to the junction of the A45 and the M42, close to Birmingham Airport and the National Exhibition Centre (NEC) Birmingham and attracts over 250,000 visitors a year.

== History ==
The Museum owes its formation to the drive and ambition of one man, construction entrepreneur and self-made millionaire Mr WR (Roy) Richards, who started collecting good examples of British motorcycles in the 1970s. The museum opened in October 1984 with an initial collection of 350 machines. Richards died in 2008 but the museum continues under the guardianship of his widow Christine and his sons Simon and Nick Hartland. The Museum collection is curated by Museum Director James Hewing.

== 2003 Fire ==
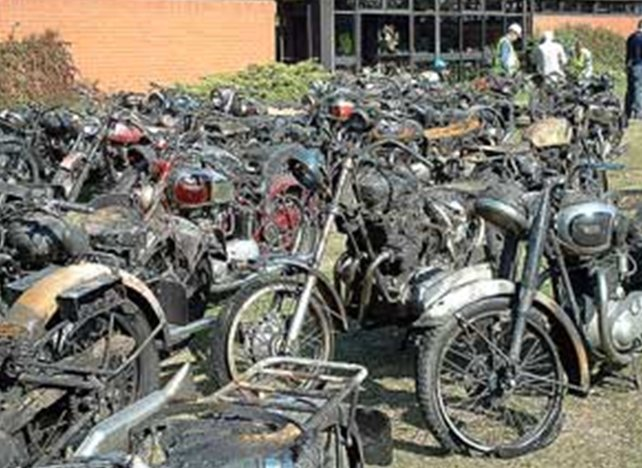
Aftermath of the fire

The museum was severely damaged by a fire which broke out shortly before 5pm on 16 September 2003. West Midlands Fire Service investigators concluded that a cigarette thrown away in a designated smoking area was responsible for igniting a pile of cardboard boxes containing old air-conditioning filters. The fire spread very rapidly inside the museum's dropped ceilings which, though conforming to safety regulations, lacked a sprinkler system. The building did have smoke detection and fire alarm equipment which contacted the fire service within minutes of the fire starting, but the fire had taken a strong hold before it was discovered on site.

Staff and people attending a conference helped to save more than 300 historic motorcycles, but three of the five exhibition halls were completely burnt out. 120 firefighters were needed to put out the fire which was visible for 15 miles (24 km). Fire crews were delayed by rush hour traffic and hindered by an inadequate hydrant on site, but the fire was extinguished after about an hour and a half. Many of the museum's rarest and irreplaceable exhibits were destroyed, with the loss of 380 motorcycles. The cost of the fire was estimated at over £14 million.

After fifteen months and a £20 million rebuild which included installation of a £1.2 million sprinkler system, the museum was reopened on 1 December 2004. 150 of the motorcycles that had been destroyed in the fire were fully restored for the re-opening. Many of the fire damaged motorcycles were restored to showroom condition.

== 2014 Burglary ==
On the evening of 27 August 2014, burglars broke into the museum and stole more than 100 motorcycling competition trophies from a glass-fronted cabinet. The Museum offered a £20,000 reward for information leading to their recovery.

== Exhibits ==
The motorcycles on display represent examples of well known makes, such as BSA, Triumph and Norton as well as less well known makers including Coventry-Eagle, Montgomery and New Imperial.

=== Golden Dream Brough ===
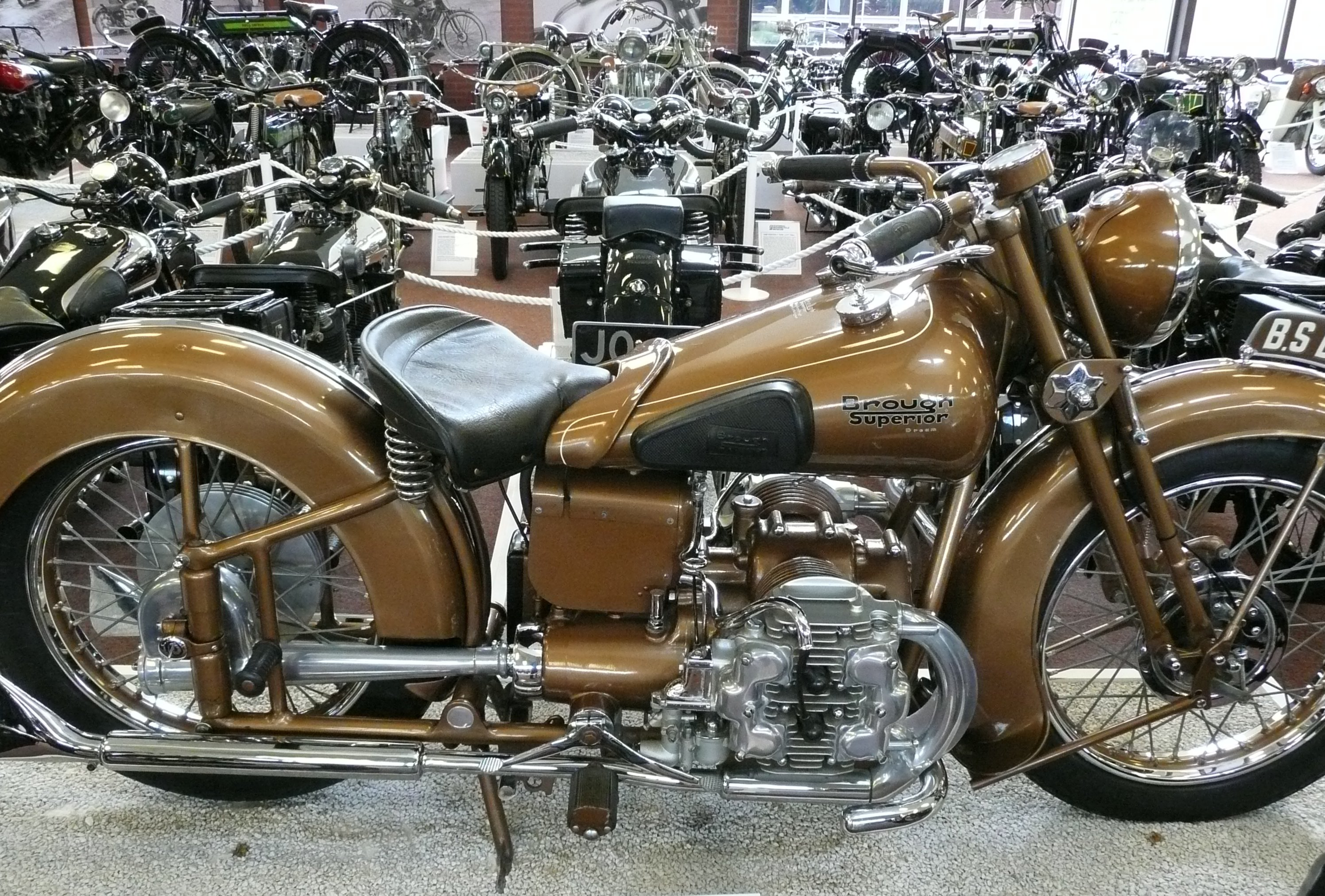
Golden Dream Brough Superior

One of the most valuable motorcycles in the world the Brough Superior Golden Dream, which is the only example of George Brough's show model for the 1938 Olympia show. Hand-built by Brough and Freddie Dixon, the Golden Dream has two pairs of horizontally opposed cylinders, one above the other, with two longitudinal crankshafts to give vibration free running. The two crankshafts shafts are geared together, with one driving the rear wheel and the other driving the oil pump and magdyno. Two Brough Dream Fours were built but World War II stopped development. The second Brough Dream has a black and chrome finish and is in private ownership.

=== Wilkinson Luxury Tourer ===
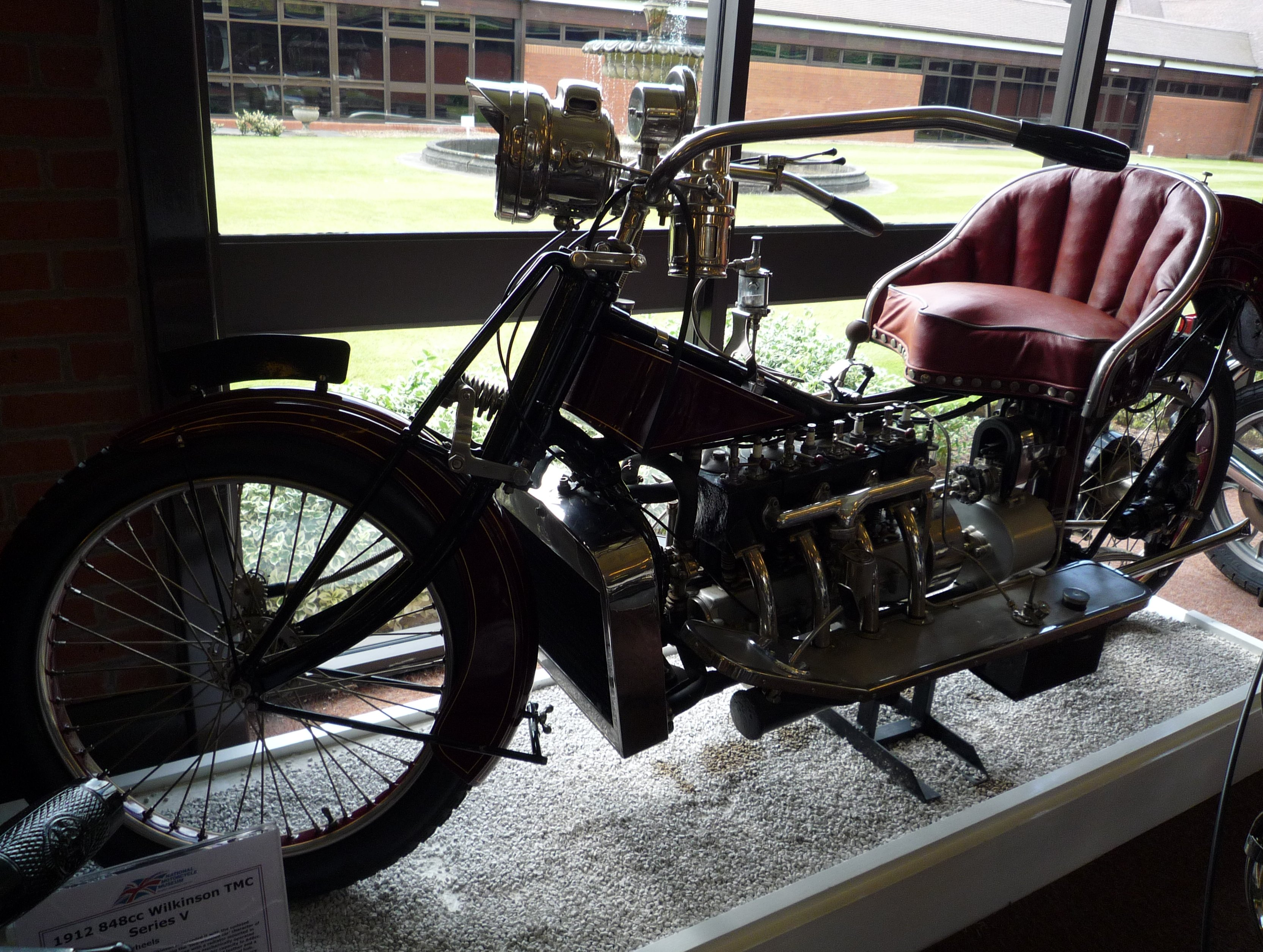
Wilkinson 850

Built by the Wilkinson Sword company before the First World War, the first Wilkinson motorcycles were aimed at military use. Optional accessories included a sidecar complete with Maxim gun, and a steering wheel instead of handlebars. The model displayed in the museum was built in 1912 and is the top-of-the-range four-cylinder water-cooled shaft drive version. Originally air-cooled, the Wilkinson TMC engine was water-cooled from 1911 and described as a ‘Luxury Touring Motor Cycle’.

== See also ==
- Outline of motorcycles and motorcycling
