= John B. Brough =

American philosopher (born 1941)

John Brough
- Born: 1941 (age 84–85)

Education
- Education: Georgetown University (PhD)

Philosophical work
- Era: 21st-century philosophy
- Region: Western philosophy
- Institutions: Georgetown University
- Main interests: phenomenology, philosophy of art, history of modern philosophy

John B. Brough (born 1941) is an American philosopher and Professor Emeritus of Philosophy at Georgetown University. He is known for his works on phenomenology.

== Books ==
- The many faces of time, edited with Lester Embree, Springer 2010
