= Broch (disambiguation) =

A broch is a type of prehistoric stone roundhouse found in Scotland.

Broch may also refer to:

== Buildings ==
- Broch of Clickimin, a broch near Lerwick, Shetland
- Broch of Culswick, an unexcavated coastal broch in Shetland
- Broch of Gurness, a broch on the northwest coast of Mainland, Orkney
- Broch of Mousa, a broch on the island of Mousa, Shetland
- Burroughston Broch, a broch on the island of Shapinsay, Orkney
- Edin's Hall Broch, a broch near Duns in the Scottish Borders

== People ==
- Brigitte Broch (born 1943), German born, Mexican set decorator
- Hermann Broch (1886–1951), Austrian writer
- Hugo Broch (1922–2026), German Luftwaffe ace
- Lars Oftedal Broch (1939–2017), Norwegian judge
- Nicolai Cleve Broch (born 1975), Norwegian actor of theatre and film
- Ole Jacob Broch (1818–1889), Norwegian mathematician, physicist, economist and politician
- Theodor Broch (1904–1998), Norwegian lawyer and politician for the Labour Party

== Places nicknamed "The Broch" ==
- Fraserburgh, Aberdeenshire, Scotland
- Burghead, Moray, Scotland

== See also ==
- Brach (disambiguation)
- Brooch, a type of ornament
- Brough (disambiguation)
