= Brough Motorcycles =

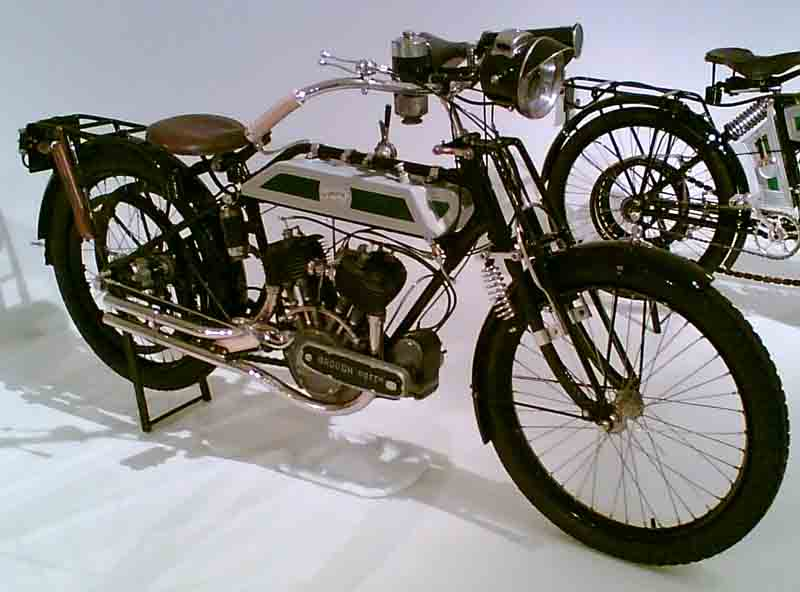
- Industry: Motorcycle manufacturer
- Founded: 1902
- Founder: William E. Brough
- Defunct: 1926
- Fate: Defunct
- Headquarters: Nottingham, England

Brough Motorcycles were made by William E. Brough in Nottingham, England, from 1902 to 1926 , after some earlier experimentation with motorised tricycles. The Brough Superior company was a separate company created by his son, George Brough.

== Models up to the end of WWI (up to 1918) ==
The first Brough motorcycle was built in 1902 and had a single-cylinder engine mounted on the downtube. By 1908, there was a range of models with 2.5 hp and 3.5 hp single-cylinder and 5 hp V-twin engines (all made by Brough). By 1912, there was a 6 hp V-twin, and an 8 hp engine was also made intended for use in the Brough light car.

In 1913, William Brough developed a flat-twin engine in-line with the frame. This 497cc engine had overhead valves, 70mm bore and 64.5mm stroke, and had a magneto fitted above and a 2-speed gearbox below. By the end of 1914, it had replaced all other engines in the Brough range, and using it, only 3-models were planned for 1915. The three models were the HS, which was fitted with a two-speed countershaft gear operated by dog clutches, with chain drive to the gearbox, and John Bull rubber belt drive to the rear wheel over an adjustable pulley allowing the top gear range to be varied. No clutch or kick-start was provided. The second model was the HB, which was fitted with a Sturmey-Archer 3-speed hub gearbox and handle starter. The third model was the HTT, which was very similar to the HS but fitted with a specially tuned engine with high-compression, lightweight steel pistons, different camshafts, and special front cylinder lubrication.

During the war, Brough introduced a larger flat-twin of 6 hp rating, with 70mm bore and 90mm stroke (692cc), it shared a lot in common with the earlier 6 hp V-twin.

== Post-War ==
At the end of 1918, George Brough had been developing his own ideas on the design of his father's flat twin engine. A new 500cc job. The engine had detachable heads with the valve seats integral and the rockers enclosed in neat aluminium cases. Light aluminium pistons, roller bearing crankshaft, and two ball bearing-mounted camshafts. This was bench tested at 14 bhp at 4200rpm, and could go to 5600rpm. George Brough guaranteed it to the sum of £100.

George Brough had been a partner in his father's company. He split from it in 1919 (father William objected to the costs of the new 500cc engine George had been testing; it was all about cost ) and started his own factory on Hadyn Road in Nottingham. The first Brough Superiors were made in the garage of Stockhill Lodge, on Nuttall Road. Stockhill House was where his father then lived. He named his motorcycles "Brough Superior".

2/2/1919 A friend & drinking crony of George, called 'Bob' Blay, purchased a W E Brough. Registration Al 4659 Georges first 90 Bore prototype HP 2122 was made mid 1919. George Brough and Bob Blay propped up the bar in a pub. George, after a few beers, says he really does not know what to call his new machine. Bob, who has recently acquired a W E Brough, chips in,” I 've got one of your father's Brough machines, and yours is better than that, why not 'Brough Superior'. Robert Blay is also later recorded as the first owner of a Nottingham 1922 Mark I side-valve machine, registration AU 5708

Upon hearing the name of the new motorcycle company, his father was reputed to have made the comment, "I suppose that makes mine the Brough Inferior".

The two sizes of Brough flat-twin engine were still in production in 1922 when Brough announced a modified version with roller cam followers, light aluminium pistons, removable valve seats, and the engine base extended to mount the three-speed Sturmey-Archer gearbox. William Brough continued to produce motorcycles under the original "Brough" marque until 1926.
