= Brough Superior =

Brand of English motorcycles and automobiles

Brough Superior Logo

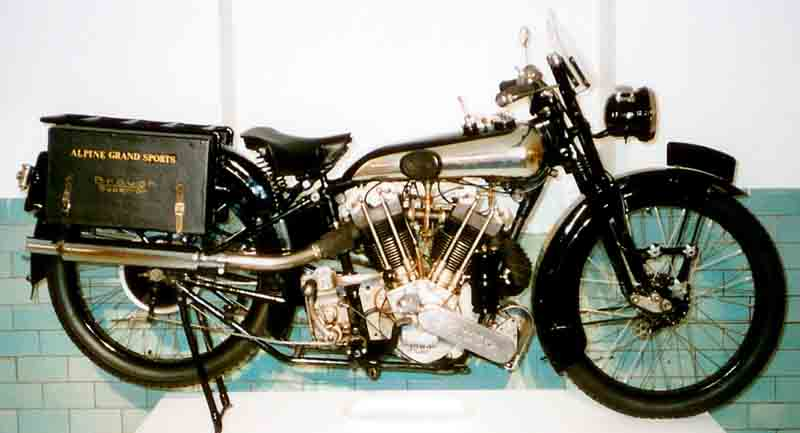
Brough Superior SS 100 1925

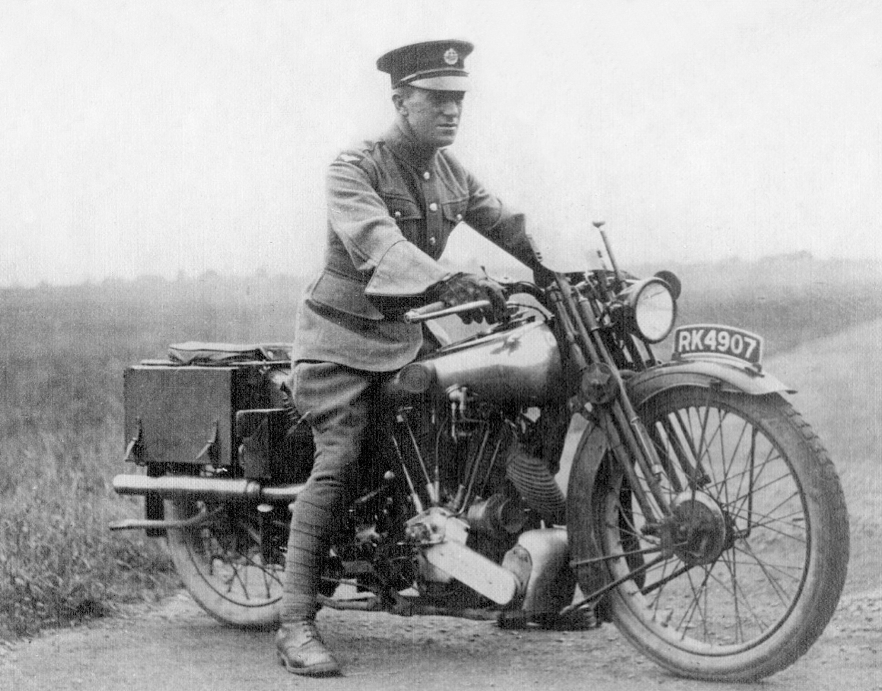
Lawrence of Arabia on a Brough Superior he called George V. Lawrence owned eight Broughs: 1922: Boa (short for Boanerges) 1923: George I 1924: George II 1925: George III 1926: George IV 1927: George V (RK 4907; see photo) 1929: George VI (UL 656) 1932: George VII (GW 2275) (the bike he died riding) Undelivered: George VIII (still being built when Lawrence was killed).

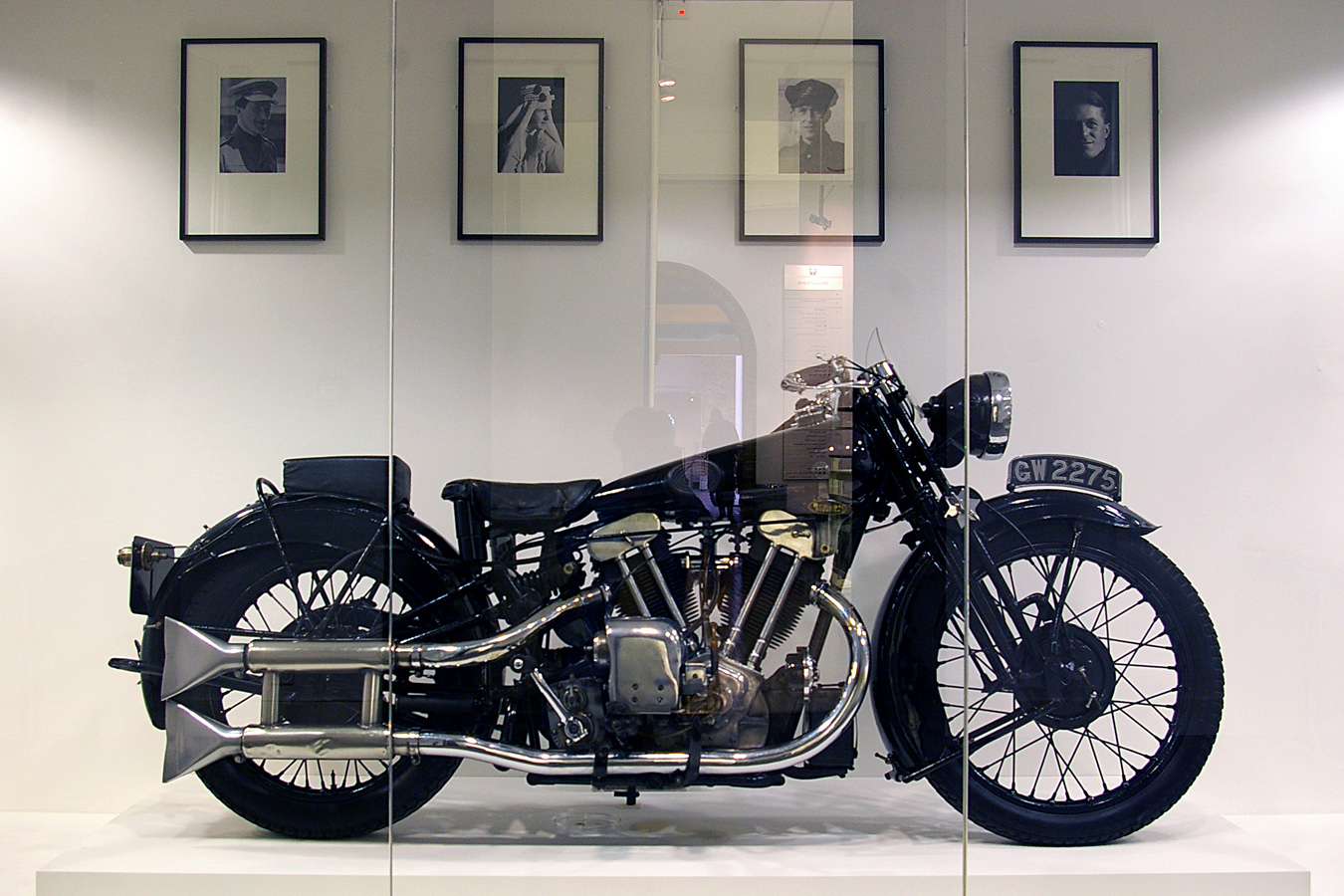
T. E. Lawrence's seventh Brough Superior, GW 2275, the one on which he had his fatal crash. It is at the Imperial War Museum.

Brough Superior (/ˈbrʌf/ BRUF) motorcycles, sidecars, and motor cars were made by George Brough in his Brough Superior works on Haydn Road in Nottingham, England, from 1919 to 1940. The motorcycles were dubbed the "Rolls-Royce of Motorcycles" by H. D. Teague of The Motor Cycle magazine. Approximately 3048 motorcycles (19 models) were made in the 21 years of production; around a third of that production still exists. T. E. Lawrence ("Lawrence of Arabia") owned eight of these motorcycles and died from injuries sustained when he crashed number seven; the eighth was on order.

In 2008, vintage motorcycle enthusiast Mark Upham acquired the rights to the Brough Superior name. In 2013 he met motorcycle designer Thierry Henriette and asked him to design a new Brough Superior motorcycle. Three months later a prototype of a new SS100 was shown in Milan. Serial production of the revived Brough Superior brand began in 2016.

== History ==
George Brough was a racer, designer, and showman - his father William E. Brough had been making Brough Motorcycles in Nottingham since 1908, and continued to do so until 1926. Convinced he could improve on his father's designs, George Brough ensured that all Brough Superior motorcycles were high performance and of superior quality. Most were custom-built to the customer's needs, and rarely were any two of the same configuration.

Each motorcycle was assembled twice. The first assembly was to fit all the components. Then the motorcycle was disassembled and all the parts painted or plated as needed. Finally, the finished parts were assembled a second time. Every motorcycle was test ridden to ensure that it performed to specification, and was personally certified by George Brough. The SS100 model was ridden at 100 mph (160 km/h) or more before delivery. The SS80 model was ridden at 80 mph (130 km/h) or more before delivery. If any motorcycle did not meet specification, it was returned to the works for rework until it performed properly. The fit and finish was comparable to a Rolls-Royce car, and they were the most expensive road-going motorcycles in the world.

Brough Superior motorcycles have always been rare and expensive. Prices for these motorcycles ranged from £100 to £185 in the 1920s and 1930s. Since the average annual salary in Britain during the 1930s was £200, only the wealthy could afford them.

In 1940, the Second World War brought an end to production as the factory was engaged on war work, completing crankshafts for Rolls-Royce Merlin engines. After hostilities had ceased there were no suitable engines available so the company was wound up. In 2004, around 1,000 Brough Superior motorcycles still existed.

== Brough Superior motorcycles ==
Early models include the Brough Superior Mark I Sidevalve, Mark I Overhead, Mark II Standard and Mark II Sports. Early to mid manufacture included the Overhead 500, 680 S.V. Junior, and 750 Side Valve, but these were not popular and were dropped from production.

The following four models represent the bulk of manufacture. Most were custom built to order and many variations were made:

- The SS100 (Super Sports), powered by J.A.P. (J. A. Prestwich of Tottenham) or Matchless 1000 cc overhead valve V-twin engines. Approximately 383 were manufactured from 1924 to 1940.
- The SS80 (Super Sports), powered by J.A.P. or Matchless 1,000 cc sidevalve V-twin engines. Approximately 1,086 were manufactured from 1922 to 1940.
- The 680 O.H.V., powered by J.A.P. 680 cc overhead valve V-twin. Approximately 547 were manufactured from 1926 to 1936.
- The 11.50, powered by J.A.P 1096 cc sidevalve 60° V-twin engines. These were primarily designed for sidecar and police use. Approximately 308 were manufactured from 1933 to 1940. The model name refers to the horsepower rating of the engine, 11 RAC (Royal Automobile Club), 50 bhp (37 kW). In reality these engines produced under 30 bhp (under 22 kW). Tax horsepower ratings were required by manufactures for tax purposes. RAC HP equals the piston diameter squared times the number of cylinders divided by 2.5.

Brough Superior produced many other experimental, show, and racing models. These include:

- Golden Dream. This was powered by a vertically stacked twin crankshaft opposed four cylinder engine. George Brough called this a "flat vertical" engine, which used a shaft final drive. The bike was finished in gold paint for the London Motorcycle Show. It was unveiled at the motorcycle show at Earls Court in 1938.
- Brough Superior Austin Four or BS4. This bike was powered by a modified Austin 7 automobile engine and transmission. As the prop-shaft of the automotive transmission emerged in the center of the motorcycle's driveline, George Brough used two rear wheels mounted to a central, cast final drive unit. As the rear wheels were within 24" of each other, the Brough Superior 3-wheeler was legally considered a 'motorcycle' in the UK. It remains the only motorcycle in history to use this configuration. The Brough-Austin Four was intended for sidecar use, although one was ordered without a sidecar by journalist Hubert Chantry, who had borrowed a factory show model for use in the Land's End Trial of 1932. 10 examples were built.
- Pendine. This was introduced in 1927 and had a guaranteed top speed of 110 mph (180 km/h). They were based on the SS100 model but with higher performance modifications to the engine. A well known racer, Barry Baragwanath, installed a supercharger on one, and it is now known as "Barry's Big Blown Brough". Noel Pope bought the motorcycle and in 1939 set two lap records with it at Brooklands; 107 mph (172 km/h) with sidecar, and 124 mph (200 km/h) in solo configuration, which exceeded the previous record set in 1935 by Eric Fernihough also on a Brough Superior. These records still stand as the track closed in 1939.

George Brough was known for his dedication to his vehicles and customers. He, and later Albert Wallis, continued to service Brough Superiors after production ceased, making parts until 1969. To all intents and purposes production of bikes did not resume after the Second World War.

=== Production figures ===
- 1919 - 1
- 1920 - 1
- 1921 - 3
- 1922 - 103
- 1923 - 119
- 1924 - 195
- 1925 - 168
- 1926 - 95
- 1927 - 226
- 1928 - 155
- 1929 - 139
- 1930 - 131
- 1931 - 117
- 1932 - 58
- 1933 - 121
- 1934 - 104
- 1935 - 94
- 1936 - 187
- 1937 - 173
- 1938 - 159
- 1939 - 118
- 1940 - 10

To this list may be added thirteen motorcycles without a date on their build card. Many records are incomplete for the first few years of production and for some of the low production models. The estimated total production was 3,048 machines.

=== Racing ===
Riders of Brough Superiors have won many races—sprints (drag racing), hillclimbs, and top speed. Victories include:

- 1922, George Brough, First Sidevalve Motorcycle to lap Brooklands at 100 mph (160 km/h).
- 1927, 11 June: R. E. Thomas, 2 1/2 Miles Sprint for Unlimited Capacity Solo Machines, Cefn Sidan Speed Trials. 1st place.
- 1927, 11 June: R. E. Thomas, 10 Miles for Unlimited Solo machines, Cefn Sidan Speed Trials. 1st place.
- 1927, 11 September: R. E. Thomas, 2 1/2 Miles Sprint for Unlimited Capacity Solo Machines, Cefn Sidan Speed Trials. 1st place.
- 1927, 11 September: R. E. Thomas, 10 Miles Unlimited Race for Solo Machines, Cefn Sidan Speed Trials. 1st place.
- 1927, 11 September: R. E. Thomas, 25 Miles Race for Unlimited Solo Machines, Cefn Sidan Speed Trials. 1st place.
- 1927, 11 September: R. E. Thomas, 50 Miles Race for Unlimited Solo Machines, Cefn Sidan Speed Trials. 1st place.
- 1928: George Brough, one mile (1.6 km) sprint, Pendine. 1st place.
- 1928: R. E. Thomas, one mile (1.6 km) sprint, Pendine. 2nd place.
- 1931: J.H. Carr, 50 Miles Any Power Solo, Pendine. 1st place.
- 1931: J.H. Carr, 100 Miles Any Power Solo, Pendine. 1st place.
- 1935: Eric Fernihough, Brooklands motor-cycle lap record for all classes, 123.58 mph (198.88 km/h).
- 1936: Eric Fernihough, Motorcycle Land Speed Record for the mile. 163.82 mph (263.64 km/h).
- 1937: Eric Fernihough, Motorcycle Land Speed Record for the flying kilometre. 169.8 mph (273.3 km/h).
- 1937: Eric Fernihough, Sidecar Motorcycle Land Speed Record for the flying kilometre. 137 mph (220 km/h).

In 2013 Brough Superior said it would return to Grand Prix motorcycle racing with a prototype machine for Moto2, the Carbon2, a motorcycle made by California builders Taylormade and rebranded as a Brough Superior.

== Brough Superior sidecars ==
Brough Superior also manufactured sidecars. The sidecars had coach-built bodies, and some carried a spare tyre, while others offered two seats for occasional use. The fit and finish of these sidecars were of the highest standard, as were the motorcycles. These sidecars all offered good protection from the elements. Many of the earlier sidecars were built to Brough Superior specification, while later sidecar frames were manufactured in the Brough Superior factory. Later sidecars were unique in the fact that the frame of the sidecar held fuel. The sidecar frame looped over the top of the sidecar body and had a filler cap at the topmost position. Fuel was pressurized by a hand pump that transferred fuel from the sidecar to the petrol tank on the motorcycle. Two different bodies could be ordered for the petrol tube sidecar; cruiser or sports. The various sidecars were offered in the yearly Brough Superior sales catalogs:

- 1921: "Sporting Sidecar" manufactured by Montgomery Sidecars to Brough Superior Specifications.
- 1922: "Sidecar" registered to the design of the manufacturer.
- 1923: "Brough Superior Sidecar" registered to the design of the manufacturer.
- 1924: "Brough Superior Sidecar", "Brough Superior Swallow Coupe", "Brough Superior Sporting", "Brough Superior Sporting Tourist".
- 1925: "Brough Superior Sporting Sidecar", "Brough Superior Touring Sidecar".
- 1926: "Brough Superior Super Sports Sidecar", and made mention of other sidecars available.
- 1927: "Brough Superior Touring Sports" was mentioned in the 1928 catalog mentions the popularity of it in 1927. No mention of sidecars were in the 1927 catalog.
- 1928: "Brough Superior Touring Sports", "Brough Superior Cruiser" are listed.
- 1929: "Brough Superior Spring Frame Cruiser" Sidecar is introduced with reference to many other sidecars available.
- 1930: "Brough Superior Spring Frame Cruiser" Sidecar, and "Brough Superior Rigid Frame Cruiser" Sidecar. Reference is also made to many other sidecars available.
- 1931: "Brough Superior Cruiser Sidecar", available in spring frame or rigid frame configuration.
- 1932: "Brough Superior Cruiser Sidecar", offered with the Brough Superior Straight 4 Combination. And another "Cruiser" sidecar shown with one of the V-twin models. The "Cruiser" is offered in spring frame or rigid frame configuration.
- 1933: "Brough Superior Cruiser Sidecar" with mention of "Any type or make of Sidecar supplied. Send for lists."
- 1934: "Brough Superior Cruiser Sidecar", "Brough Superior Occasional 2-seater Sidecar."
- 1935: "Brough Superior Cruiser Sidecar", "Brough Superior Touring Sidecar."
- 1936: "Brough Superior Touring Sidecar", "Brough Superior Cruiser Sidecar."
- 1937: "B.S Alpine Grand Sports Sidecar", available with Cruiser or Sports body, this is also known as the Brough Superior Petrol tube sidecar. The sidecar frame holds fuel and is pressurized with an air pump allowing transfer of the fuel from the sidecar to the main petrol tank of the motorcycle without stopping.
- 1938: "B.S. Alpine Grand Sports Sidecar". Cruiser or sports body available.
- 1939: "B.S. Alpine Grand Sports Sidecar". Cruiser or sports body available.

== Brough Superior cars ==
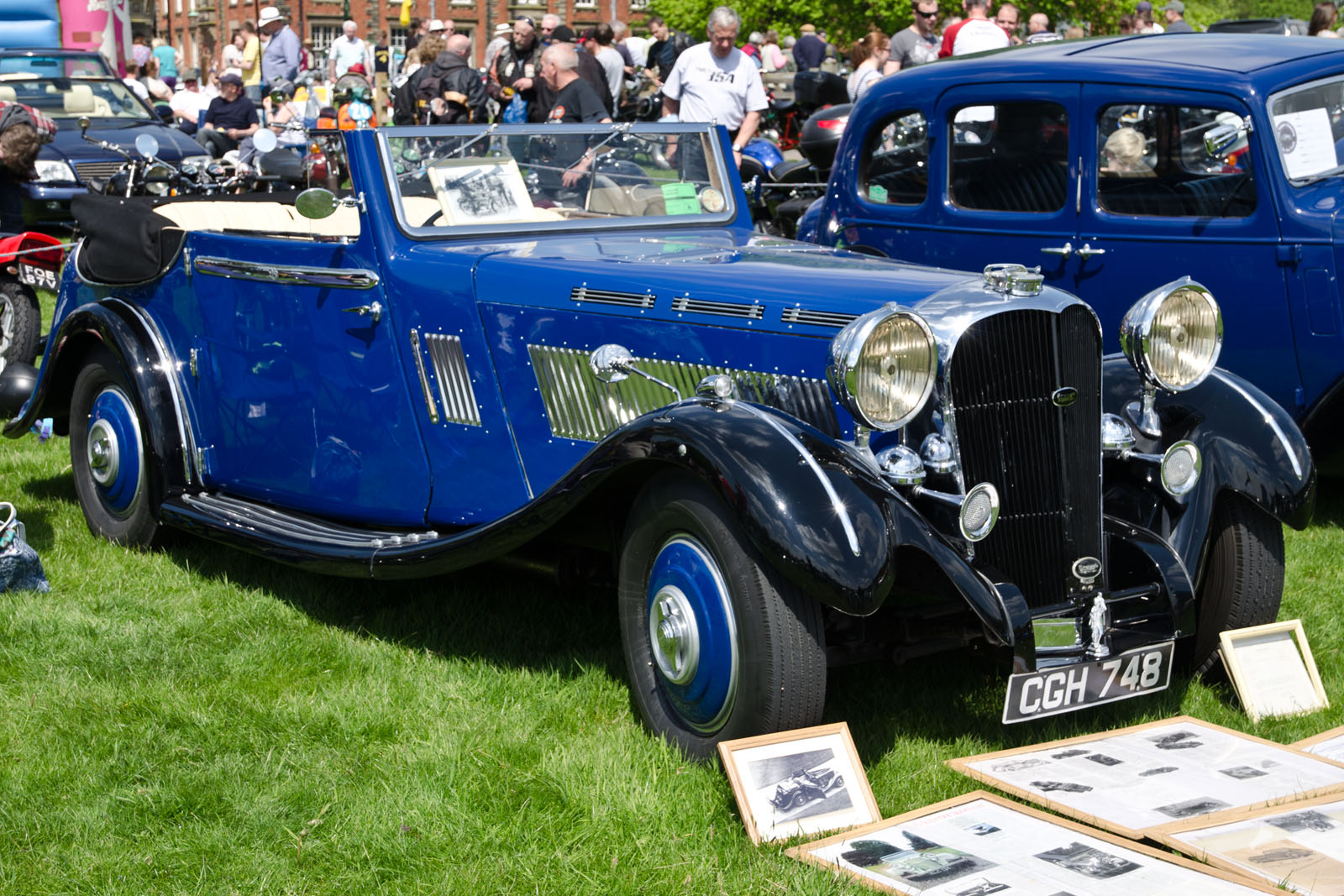
1935 Brough Superior drophead coupé

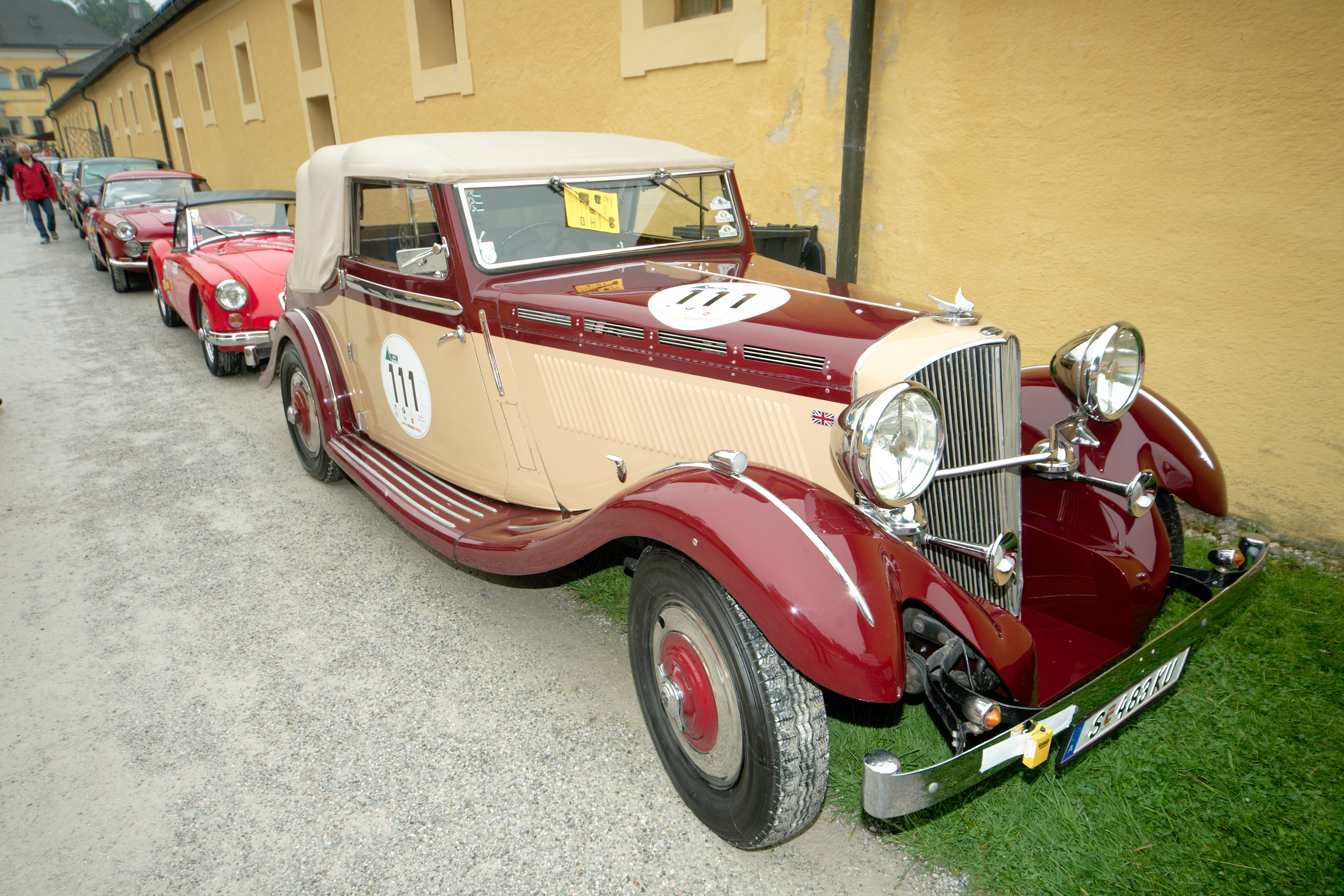
Brough superior 1937

George Brough made approximately 85 cars named Brough Superior. Built between 1935 and 1939, they were powered by Hudson engines and had a Hudson chassis. Three models were made, but only two reached production. Early cars did not carry Brough Superior badges as Brough thought the cars sufficiently distinctive in themselves.

The first car was the 4 litre made from May 1935 to 1936 using a 114 bhp (85 kW), 4,168 cc side valve, straight-eight engine. Performance was remarkable for the time with a top speed of 90 mph (140 km/h) and a 0-60 mph (97 km/h) time of under 10 seconds. Only a four-seat drop head was available with coachwork by W.C Atcherley of Birmingham. 19 were made and nine are known to have survived. This Brough designed, Atcherly coachwork of classic lines has steel guards, aluminium body over ash frame and is handsome, strong and durable. Unrestored examples are still roadworthy over 80 years later.

Hudson Canada stopped supplying the eight-cylinder engine and chassis kits in 1936, and subsequent cars had a 107 bhp (80 kW), 3,455 cc straight-six, still with side valves and called the 3.5 litre. A Centric supercharged version was also listed with a claimed output of 140 bhp (100 kW). The chassis was 4 inches (100 mm) shorter than the 4 litre at 116 inches. Saloon bodies were available but most were open cars. Approximately 80 were made between 1936 and 1939.

The final car, the XII made in 1938, used a Lincoln-Zephyr V12 engine of 4,387 cc and Brough's own design of chassis with Girling brakes and Ford axles. Only one was made with a saloon body built by Charlesworth. A large car with an overall length of 219 inches (5,600 mm) and width of 71 inches (1,800 mm), it still survives.

Journalist Bill Boddy tested an early model Brough Superior Saloon in 1936 for Motor Sport magazine. Noting the car had a reserve fuel tank, he declined to fill up before the journey. Upon running out of petrol, he could not find the switch to activate the reserve. After begging petrol from a passing lorry Boddy then encountered a motorcyclist who had crashed, and offered to help. When asked, he told Boddy that his bike was a Brough Superior and asked what was, "...the nice car in which you are giving me a lift." When told it was a Brough Superior the motorcyclist was silent for the rest of the journey. Boddy presumed this was incredulity that a famed motorcycle maker could also manufacture cars, and supposed that the motorcyclist presumed he was concussed.

== Etymology ==
The Brough surname, as with many English surnames that look like placenames, probably arose because one of George Brough's male-line ancestors came from one of several places in Britain so called. It is originally a form of the word "borough". "Superior" was a claim by George Brough of his bike's superiority over all other motorcycles, including the original Brough Motorcycles manufactured by his father, William E. Brough.

== Revival ==
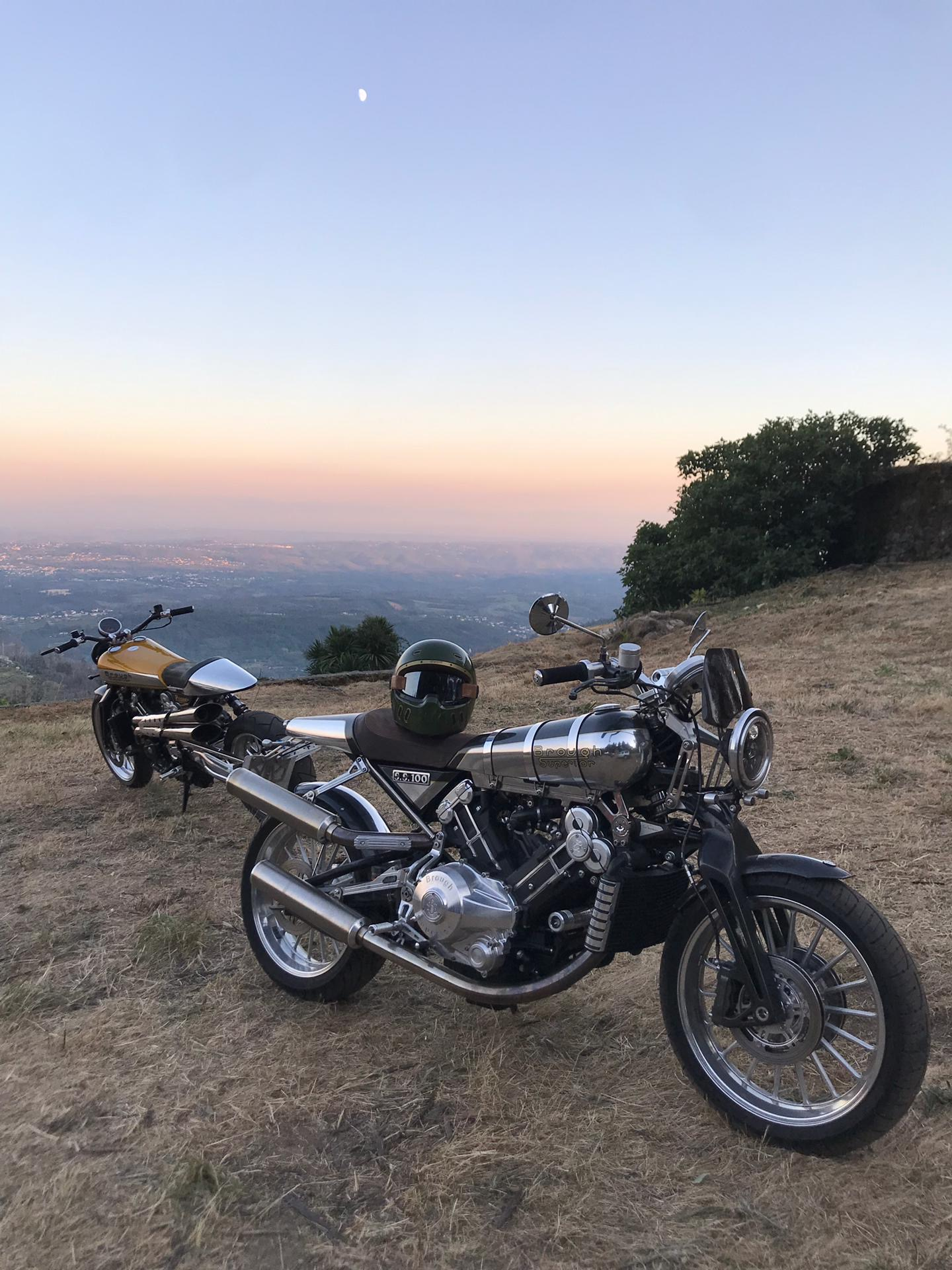
Modern S.S.100 (with modern Pendine in the background)

The Brough Superior make and name was purchased by a Jersey-registered corporation, operated by Mark Upham. He quickly asked Thierry Henriette to operate the development of new Brough Superior Motorcycles. Thierry Henriette, CEO of the French design company Boxer Design is now the owner of the Brough Superior Factory. He financed and operated the development of a new S.S.100 in respect to the original ethos of the Brough Superior marque - innovation, excellent design, and superior construction and materials. The new Boxer-designed Brough Superior S.S.100 first appeared at the EICMA show in Milan in 2013; serial production began in 2016.

The new Brough Superior S.S.100 features an 88degree, 990cc v-twin engine, with water cooling and DOHC four-valve cylinder heads, designed and built by Boxer Design. The engine produces 120 hp in standard tune, and the chassis uses the engine as a stressed member, with a Fior-based front fork with Öhlins shock absorber, with Öhlins monoshock rear suspension. The chassis is made entirely of exotic materials, including titanium, carbon fiber, and aluminum. The front brakes are from Beringer, with four rotors, sourced from the aircraft industry. The minimal bodywork is constructed of hand-hammered aluminum, including the fuel tank, seat cowl, fenders, and side covers. The dry weight of the S.S.100 is just under 400 lbs, making it among the lightest 'litre bikes' ever produced for street use.

Press reaction to the new S.S.100 has been generally positive. Road tests have praised the smooth engine, excellent handling, and contemporary performance, with some journalist praising the overall design aesthetic.

In 2017, Brough Superior presented a new model at the EICMA fair in Milan: the "Pendine Sand Racer". Reminiscing the times when Brough Superior competed on the sand beaches of Wales, the "Pendine Sand Racer" is a variation of the S.S.100 with a flat track style and higher exhausts and handlebar.

In 2019, to commemorate Brough Superior's centenary, the company launched the "Anniversary" model. Limited to 100 editions. The model is a success for Brough Superior's enthusiasts.

In November the same year, Brough Superior announced its partnership with Aston Martin to the World at the EICMA fair. Both brands gathered to present the AMB 001 (for Aston Martin Brough). Presented in the traditional Aston Martin Racing colours of Stirling Green and Lime Essence with Matte Black wheels, fork and brake assemblies, the AMB 001 features a combination of paint and bare carbon fibre. The AMB 001 boasts a turbo-charged output of 180 hp (134 kW) at just 180 kilograms (400 lb) dry weight. This turbo configuration is claimed to bring an engine response with huge torque in a wide range of engine rpm.

== See also ==
- List of car manufacturers of the United Kingdom
- List of fastest production motorcycles
