= George Brough =

British motorcycle racer (1890–1970)

- Brough, wearing his personalised flat cap, riding one of his own motorcycles in a trials competition with onlooking spectators in the background, unspecified date
- Born: 21 April 1890; Basford, Nottingham, England
- Died: 12 January 1970 (aged 79); Nottingham, England
- Occupation: Motorcycle pioneer

George Brough (/ˈbrʌf/ BRUF) (21 April 1890 – 12 January 1970) was a motorcycle racer and a world record–holding motorcycle and automobile manufacturer and showman. He was known for his powerful and expensive Brough Superior motorcycles which were the first superbikes. George died in 1970 but his legacy lives on in the many Brough Superior motorcycles maintained by enthusiasts to this day.

== Early life ==
George was the second son of Brick Presser, Colliery Electric Bell fitter and later motorcycle pioneer William Edward Brough and was born at 10 Mandalay Street, Basford, Nottingham on 21 April 1890. William Brough (son of coal miner Edward Brough, coal miner) had been building motorcycles at his factory in Nottingham since the 1890s; it was expected that George and his brother would join in the family business.

== Business ==
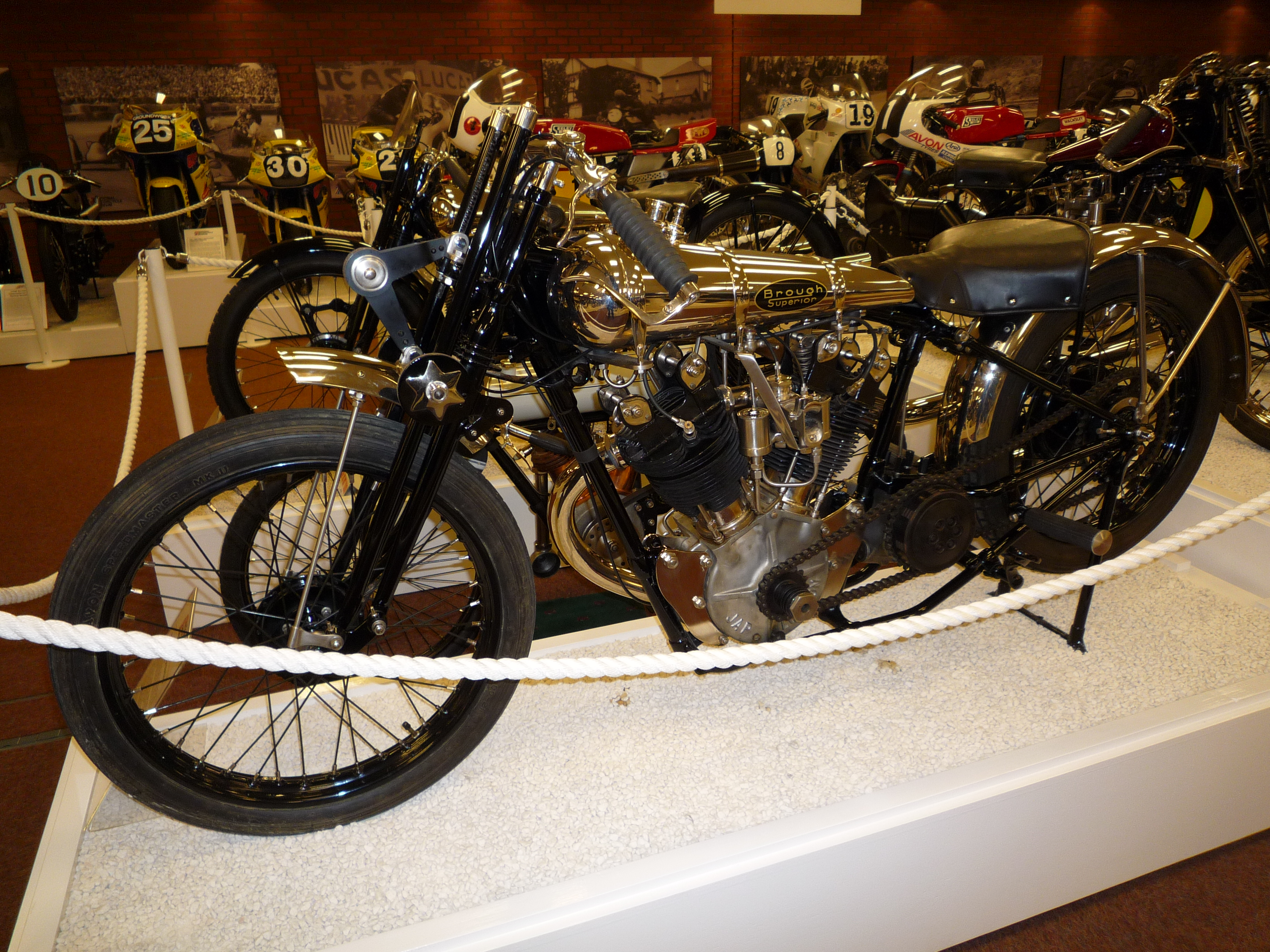
Brough Superior at the National Motorcycle Museum (UK)

George wanted to develop his father's business and make high-performance motorcycles. His father was not convinced, however, so George set up his own factory nearby in 1919 at Haydn Road in Nottingham to produce what he called the Brough Superior range of motorcycles and motor cars. The name Superior was suggested by a friend, but his father reputedly took it personally. George's motorcycles lived up to the claim, however, and he brought together the best components he could find and added distinctive styling details. He had a flair for marketing, and in 1922 rode a Brough Superior SS80 which he called Spit and Polish at Brooklands. managing an unofficial 100 mph (160 km/h) lap.

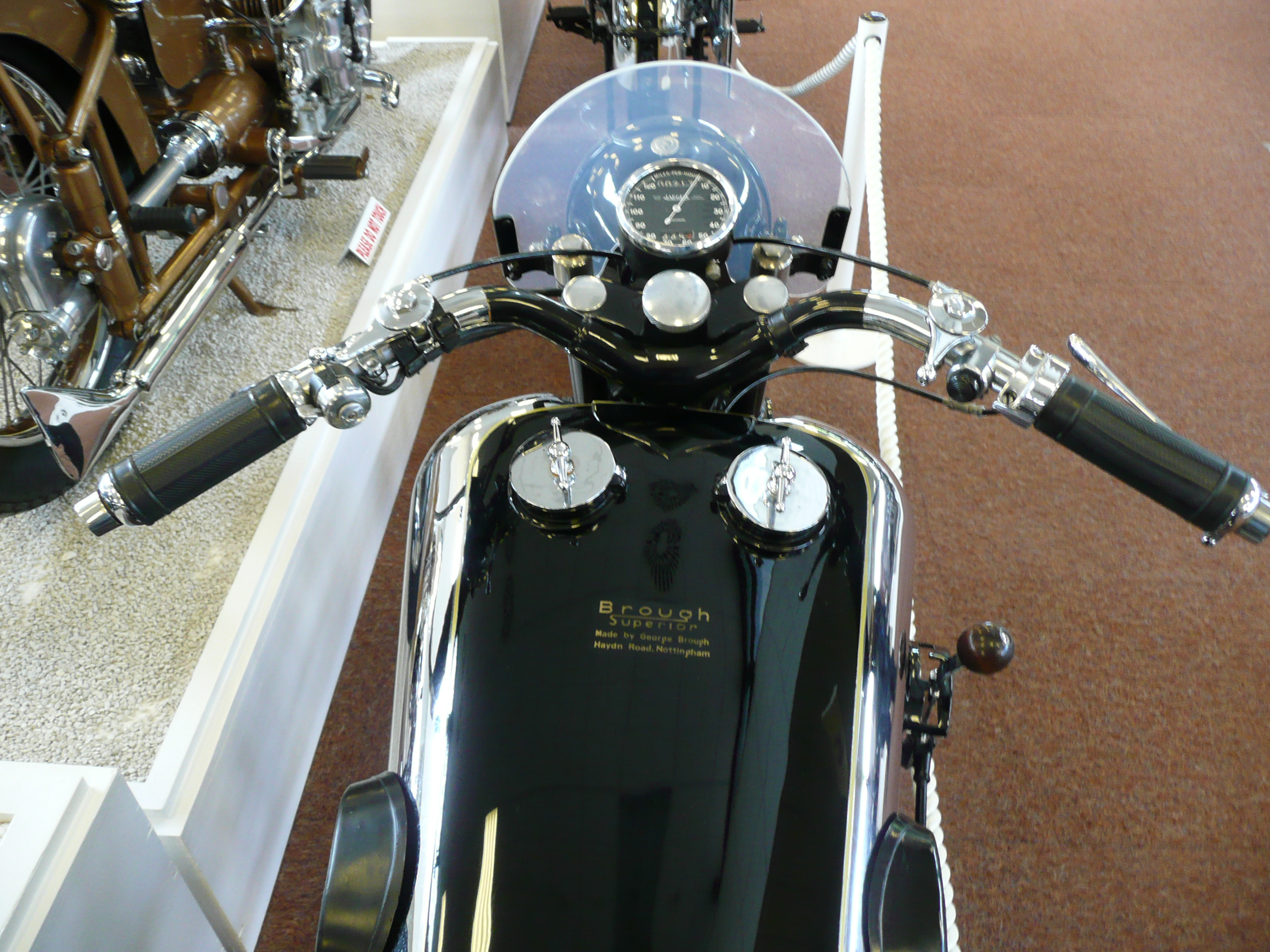
Brough Superior riders view

3,048 motorcycles of 19 models were made in 21 years of production. Most were custom-built to customers' requirements, and rarely did any two have the same configurations. Each motorcycle was assembled twice. The first assembly was for fitting of all components, then the motorcycle was disassembled, and all parts were painted or plated as needed, then the finished parts were given the final assembly. Every motorcycle was test-ridden to ensure that it performed to specification and was certified by George Brough. The SS100 model was ridden at 100 mph or more prior to delivery. The SS80 model was ridden at 80 mph (130 km/h) or more before delivery. If any motorcycle did not meet specification, it returned to the shop for rework until it performed properly.

In 1929 an SS100 was purchased by Sir William Lyons who two years later applied the same name to his own first four-wheeled vehicle, much to Brough's disgruntlement at the time, though the two later became close friends. "S" and "S" were the first two initials of the Swallow Sidecar Company which Lyons had co-founded back in 1923.

In 1940, the Second World War brought an end to production as the factory was turned over to produce Rolls-Royce Merlin aeroengines. After hostilities had ceased there were no suitable engines available, so the company was wound up.

== Racing career ==
In 1928, George Brough recorded 130.6 mph (210.2 km/h) at Arpajon, unofficially the world's fastest speed on a solo motorcycle.

Brough was noted for riding wearing a flat cap which he had specially made to his requirements.
