= Paul Brough (footballer) =

English footballer

Personal information
- Full name: Paul Brough
- Date of birth: 24 January 1965 (age 61)
- Place of birth: York, England
- Position: Striker

Senior career*
Years	Team	Apps	(Gls)
- Knaresborough Town
- York Railway Institute
1987	York City	1	(0)
- Nestlé Rowntree
Total		1	(0)
- * Club domestic league appearances and goals

Paul Brough (born 24 January 1965) is an English former professional footballer who played as a striker in the Football League for York City, and in non-League football for Knaresborough Town, York Railway Institute and Nestlé Rowntree.
