= Brough Superior SS100 =

Motorcycle produced by George Brough

Brough Superior SS 100
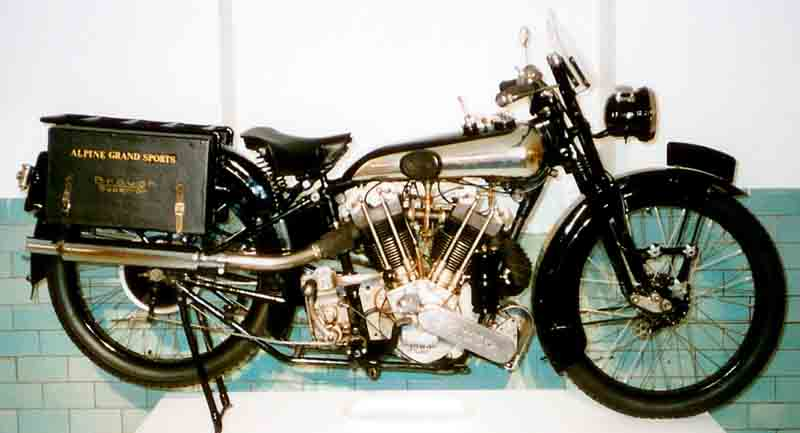
- Manufacturer: Brough Superior
- Production: 1924–1940
- Predecessor: Brough Superior SS 80
- Engine: 998 cc (60.9 cu in) air cooled OHV 50° V-twin
- Transmission: 3-speed, hand-change gearbox, chain
- Wheelbase: 59 in (1,500 mm)
- Seat height: 27 in (690 mm)
- Fuel capacity: 4.8 US gal (18 L; 4.0 imp gal)

The Brough Superior SS 100 is a motorcycle which was designed and built by George Brough in Nottingham, England in 1924. Although every bike was designed to meet specific customer requirements—even the handlebars were individually shaped—sixty-nine SS100s were produced in 1925 and at £170 (equivalent to £12,200 in 2023) were advertised by Brough as the "Rolls-Royce of Motorcycles". The term was coined by a magazine road tester in his review of the bike, and Brough eventually obtained explicit permission to use it after a Rolls-Royce executive toured the Brough Superior factory. All bikes had a guarantee that they were capable of 100 mph (160 km/h).

The SS100 (Super Sports) was the first custom motorcycle with components chosen from many different suppliers. The first engine (from 1924 to 1936) was the twin-cam KTOR JAP (made by J. A. Prestwich) V twin (upgraded to a Matchless engine from 1936). Gearboxes were the 4-stud 3-speed from Sturmey-Archer, with a chain drive. Brough developed the features of the Harley-Davidson forks and produced his own version (made by the Castle Fork and Accessory Company) to combine light weight with strength that was to become a feature of the SS100 handling.

== Development ==
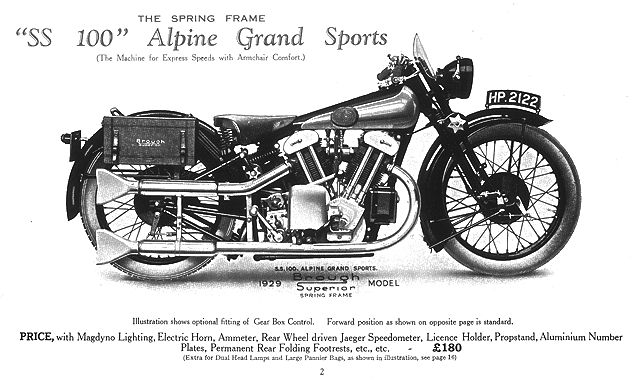
Brough Superior SS 100 Alpine Grand Sports

After the initial introduction of the SS100, the Alpine Grand Sports, an SS100 with a full touring specification. was launched at the 1925 Motorcycle Show. In the same year Brough Superior produced a 110 mph (180 km/h) Pendine Racing Model (named after the Pendine Sands where Malcolm Campbell set a number of world speed records) with increased ground clearance.

Every owner was encouraged by Brough to suggest their own ideas for developing the SS100, which meant that almost all his motorcycles were uniquely hand-built and the design continually evolving. The Sturmey-Archer gearbox was upgraded in 1929 for a three speed "super heavyweight" box to cope better with the 50 bhp (37 kW) produced by the JA Prestwich Industries (JAP) engine. In 1928 Brough introduced rear suspension and in 1934 the Alpine Grand Sports gained a 75 hp (56 kW) overhead valve JAP engine known as two of everything as it had two magnetos and two oil pumps. A foot gear-change was introduced in 1935 and a four-speed Norton gearbox in 1936. Development on all Brough Superiors was stopped during the Second World War, when the factory was turned over to war work.

== World records ==
The SS100 engineering was developed through competition and wins in over 50 events in the early 1920s, and Bert le Vack, who worked with Brough on development, was the holder of seven world records. In 1927 George Brough and Freddie Dixon both achieved a record 130 mph (209.2 km/h) for the kilometre on the SS100 and in 1928 Brough broke his own record with 130.6 mph (210.2 km/h). In 1932 Ronald Storey achieved 81.08 mph for the standing half-mile at Brighton and in 1939 Noel Pope secured an all time Brooklands track record lap time of 124.51 mph (200.38 km/h) on an SS100.

On 27 April 2008, at the Stafford Motorcycle show, the auctioneers Bonhams sold a 1934 Brough Superior SS100 for £166,500 – a world record and the highest price ever paid for a British motorcycle at auction. A new World Record for any motorcycle sold at auction was set on 22 October 2010, when a 1929 Brough Superior SS100 was sold at the Haynes International Motor Museum. The bike achieved £286,000.

== T. E. Lawrence ==
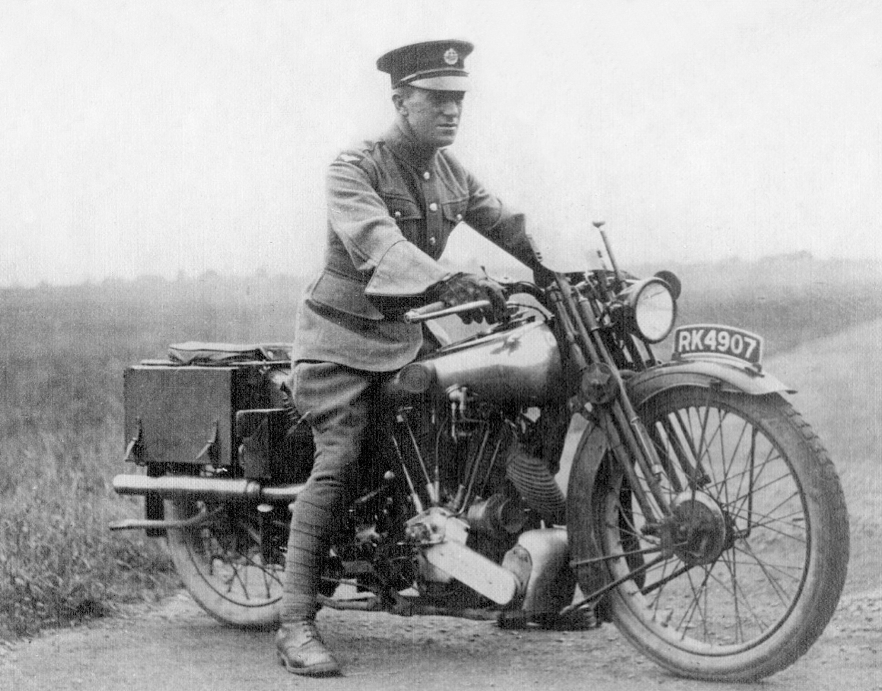
T. E. Lawrence on a Brough Superior SS100

T. E. Lawrence, Lawrence of Arabia, bought one of the first SS100s in 1925 having previously owned three Brough SS80s. The crash that would end Lawrence's life came while riding another SS100, on a narrow road near his cottage near Wareham in 1935. The accident occurred because a dip in the road obstructed his view of two boys on bicycles. Swerving to avoid them, Lawrence lost control and was thrown over the handlebars. He was not wearing a helmet and suffered serious head injuries that left him in a coma; he died after six days in hospital. One of the doctors attending him was the neurosurgeon Hugh Cairns. He consequently began a long study of what he saw as the unnecessary loss of life by motorcycle dispatch riders through head injuries and his research led to the use of crash helmets by both military and civilian motorcyclists. As a consequence of treating Lawrence, Sir Hugh Cairns ultimately saved the lives of many motorcyclists.

Lawrence's last SS100 (Registration GW 2275) was built in 1932 and is privately owned but has been on loan to the National Motor Museum at Beaulieu, Hampshire and the Imperial War Museum in London.

== New SS100 ==
In 2013 the Brough Superior company unveiled plans to build a new SS100 as a 90th anniversary tribute to the most famous Brough Superior model. The first new SS100s were delivered in 2015 and each was made to order.

The new SS100 has a 997 cc (60.8 cu in) DOHC 88° V-twin engine developed and built with French specialists Akira Engineering of Bayonne that produces 120 hp (89 kW). Produced at Henriette's Boxer Design factory in Toulouse, France, the new SS100 is hand built. The chassis is an expensive mix of magnesium, titanium, and aluminium with carbon-fiber wheels and a double-wishbone front fork. The brakes are Beringer from the aircraft industry with four-disc front brakes, motorcycling's first.

== See also ==
- List of fastest production motorcycles

Records
Preceded by Cyclone V-twin	Fastest production motorcycle 1925–1949	Succeeded by Vincent Black Shadow
