= List of motorcycles of the 1920s =

List of motorcycles of the 1920s is a listing of motorcycles of the 1920s, including those on sale, introduced, or otherwise relevant in this period.

== Motor cycle ==
- Abako
- Ace Four (until 1924, see Indian Four)
- Adma (motorcycle)
- AFW (motorcycle)
- Agon (motorcycle)
- AJT motorcycles
- AJS Model D (1912–1925)
- AJS Model E (1925–1939)
- AJW Summit
- Albert (motorcycle)
- Albertus (motorcycle)
- Ascot-Pullin 500
- Aussi Also
- Blackburne motorcycles
- Bayerische Flugzeugwerke Helios
- Flink
- BMW R32
- BMW WR 750
- Brennabor Typ A
- Brennabor Typ N
- Brennabor Typ Z
- Brough Superior SS100
- Brough Superior SS80
- BSA Model L
- BSA Sloper
- Böhmerland (motorcycle)
- Cleveland four-cylinder motorcycle
- Excelsior Super X
- FN Four (various version produced, 1905–1923)
- Hanfland motorcycles (HFD)
- Harley-Davidson Model A
- Harley-Davidson Model AA
- Harley-Davidson Model B
- Harley-Davidson Model BA
- Harley-Davidson Model W
- Harley-Davidson Model 20-F
- Harley-Davidson Model 20-J
- Harley-Davidson Model JD
- Harley-Davidson Model AA
- Henderson Motorcycle models
- HRD Motorcycles models (this became Vincent in the 1930s)
- Indian Ace
- Indian Chief
- Indian Four
- Indian Prince
- Indian Scout
- Georges Roy's New Motorcycle
- Georges Roy's The Majestic
- Matchless Model X
- Megola
- Norton Big 4 (a.k.a. Model 1)
- Norton CS1
- Norton ES2
- Norton 16H
- Ner-A-Car
- OEC
- OEC-Blackburne
- Phelon & Moore
- Scott Flying Squirrel (1926–1939)
- Triumph Werke Nürnberg Knirps, produced 1919–1923
- Triumph Model H (1915–1923)
- Triumph Model R
- Triumph Model SD
- Triumph Model P
- Triumph Model Q
- Triumph Model N
- Victoria motorcycles
- Victoria KR 1
- Velocette KSS

== Trike ==
- Scott Sociable

== Gallery ==
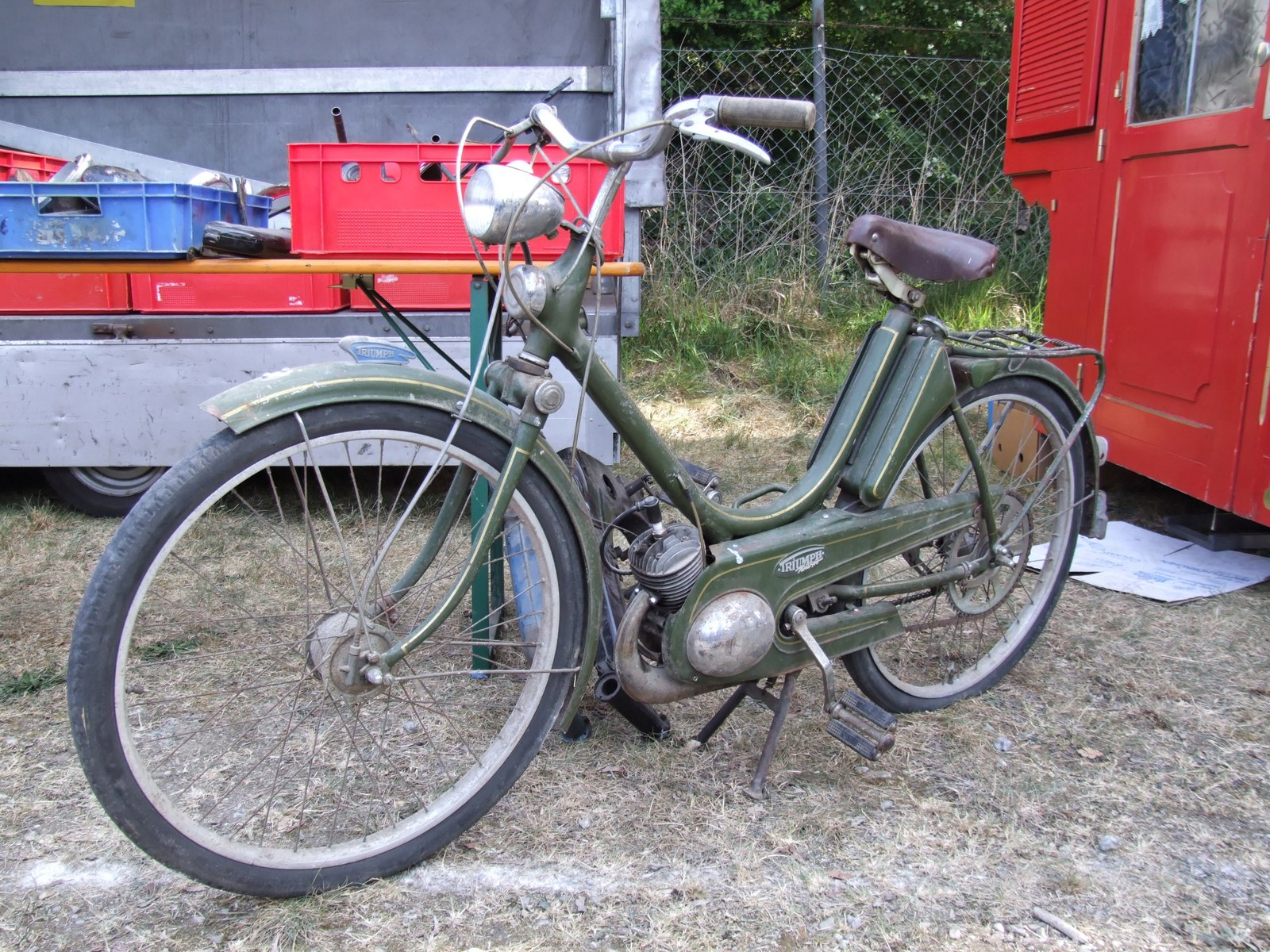
Triumph Werke Nürnberg Knirps, produced 1919–1923

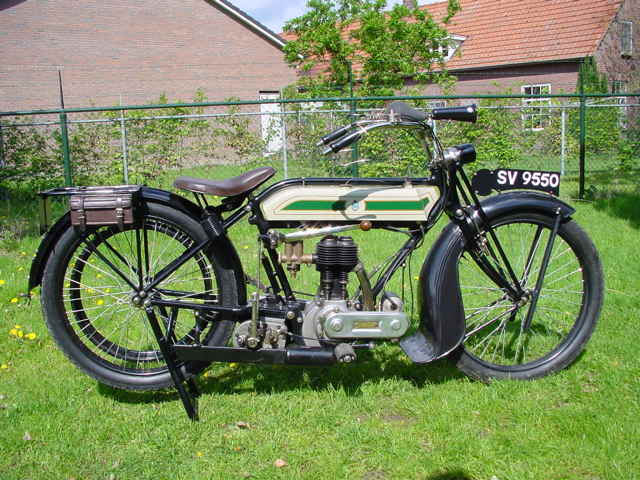
Triumph Model H

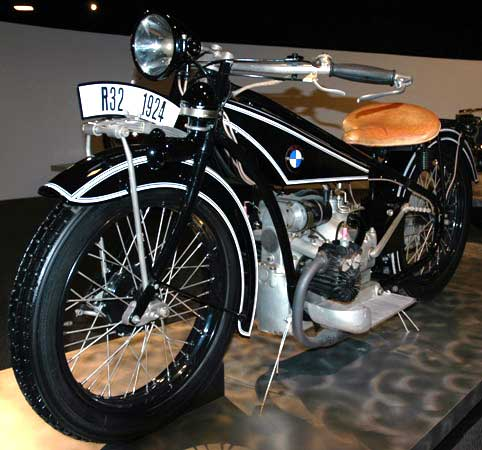
BMW R32

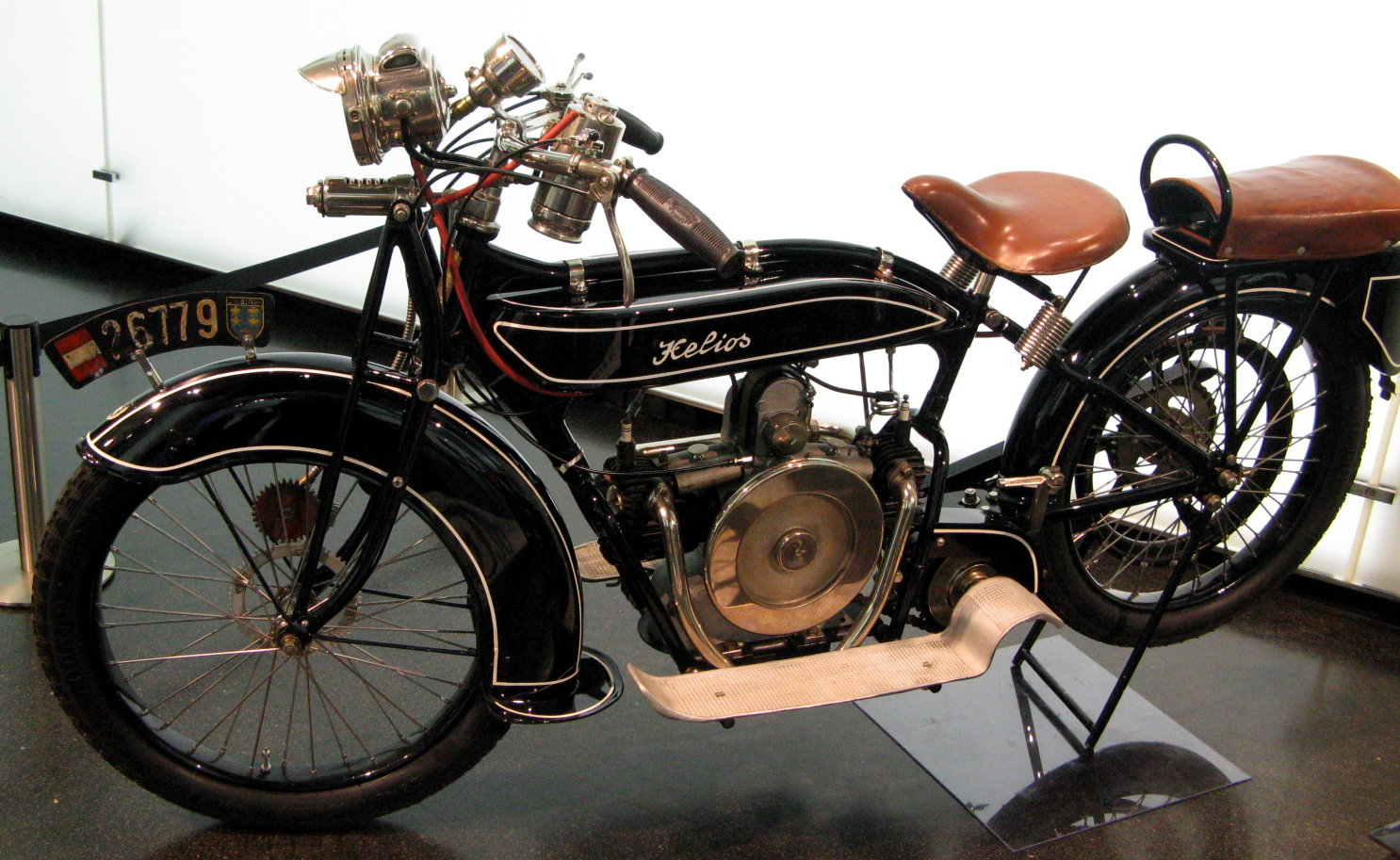
Bayerische Flugzeugwerke Helios

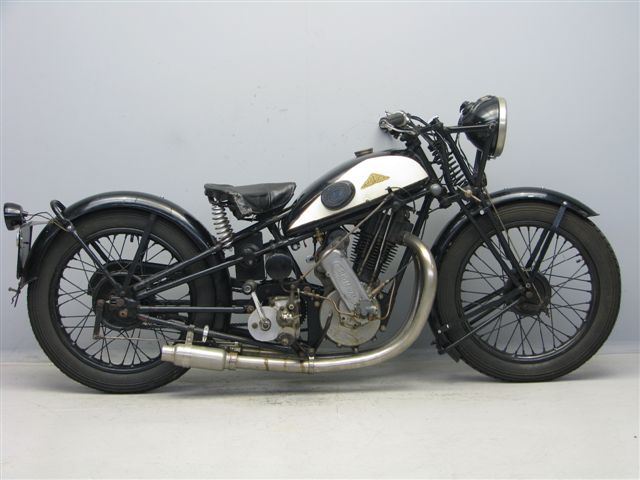
Cotton M25 Blackburne 500 cc OHV 1928

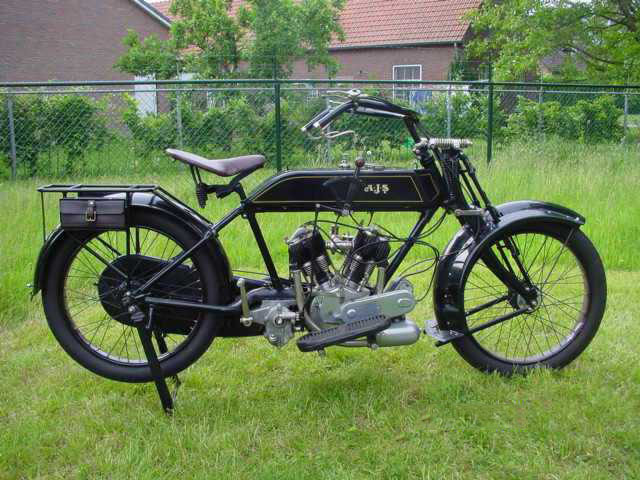
AJS Model D

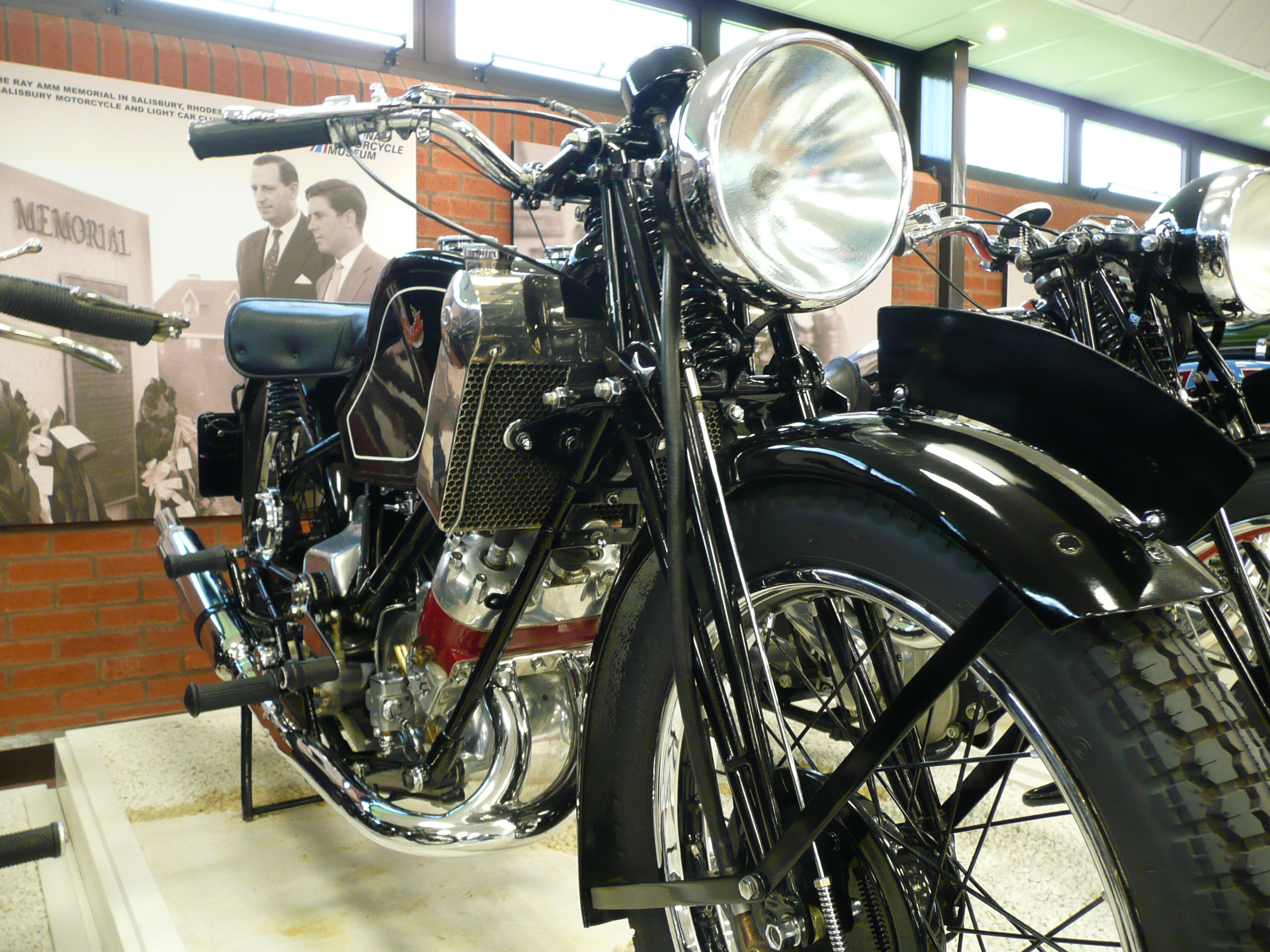
Scott Flying Squirrel

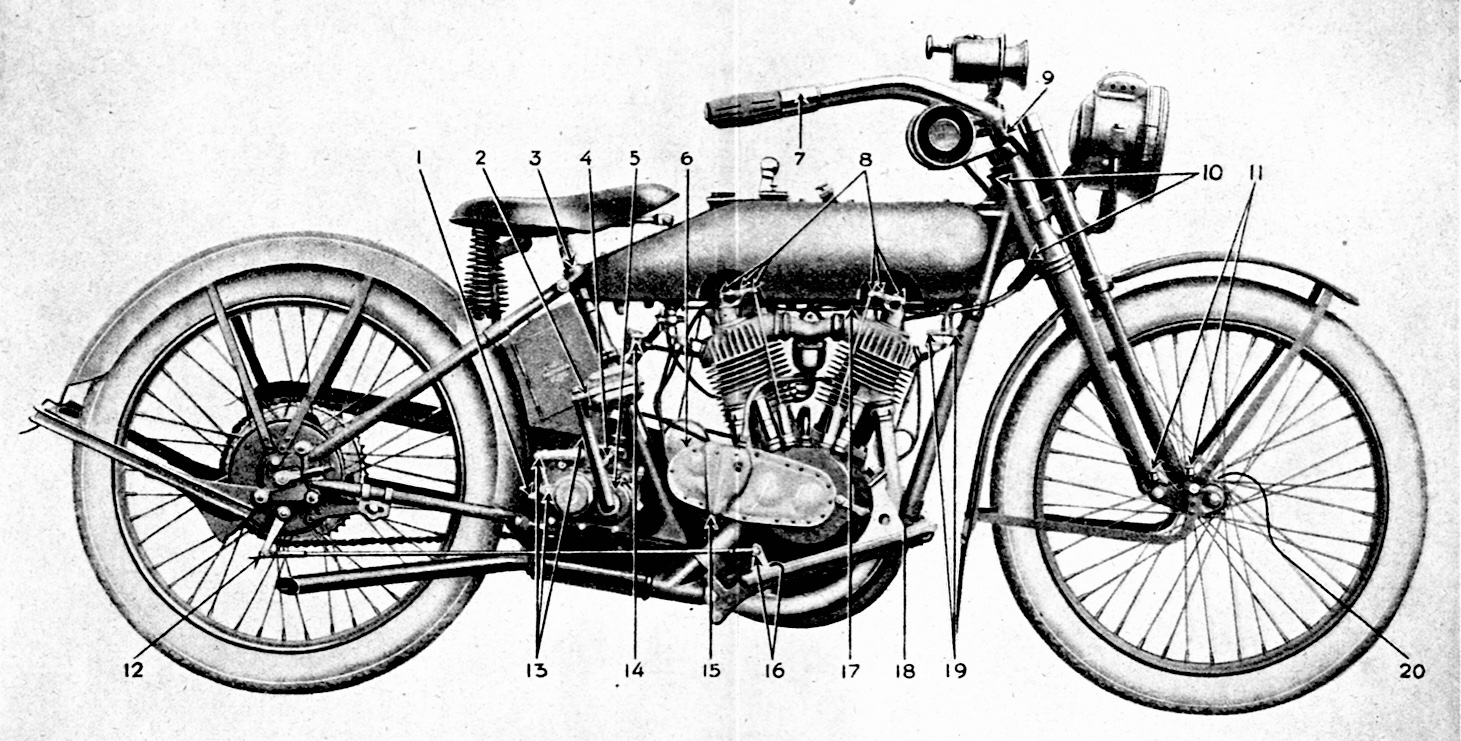
Harley-Davidson Model 20-J (1920)

== See also ==
- Ford Model T
- List of motorcycles by type of engine
- List of motorcycles of 1900 to 1909
- List of motorcycles of the 1910s
- List of motorcycles of the 1930s
- List of motorcycles of the 1940s
- List of motorcycles of the 1950s
- List of motorcycle manufacturers
- List of motorized trikes
- Safety bicycle
