= AJW =

AJW may refer to:

- AJW Motorcycles (1928–1981), a British motorcycle manufacturer
- All Japan Women's Pro-Wrestling (1968–2005), a Japanese promotion
- Asia & Japan Watch, English-language edition of Asahi Shimbun
- Andy Jones-Wilkins (born 1968), a U.S. long-distance runner
- Alpha Jet International (ICAO airline designator AJW)
- Ajawa language (ISO 639-3 code "ajw")
