= AJT =

AJT may refer to:

- Advanced jet trainer
- American Journal of Transplantation
- Alliance for Jewish Theatre
- The Atlanta Jewish Times
- AJ Tracey, a grime MC
- AJT (motorcycle), two bikes built by Arthur Tooze in Australia
