= Albertus (disambiguation) =

Albertus most commonly refers to Albertus Magnus, a 13th-century theologian.

Albertus may also refer to:

- Albertus (given name)
- Albertus (motorcycle)
- Albertus (typeface)
