= AJW Summit =

- Manufacturer: AJW Motorcycles Exeter
- Production: 1927-1931
- Engine: 996 cubic centimetres (60.8 cu in) V-twin
- Bore / stroke: 56 by 61 millimetres (2.2 in × 2.4 in)
- Top speed: 100 miles per hour (160 km/h)
- Power: 2.75–9.96 horsepower (2.05–7.43 kW) @ 6,000-7,600 rpm
- Torque: 7.3–16.1 newton-metres (5.4–11.9 lbf⋅ft) @ 3,500-4,500 rpm
- Transmission: 4-speed Manual
- Wheelbase: 56 inches (140 cm)
- Dimensions: L: 2,360 millimetres (93 in); W: 396 millimetres (15.6 in); H: 720 millimetres (28 in)
- Seat height: 650 millimetres (26 in)
- Weight: 320 pounds (150 kg) (dry)

The AJW Summit is a British high specification motorcycle made by AJW Motorcycles in Exeter between 1927 and 1931, when production was ended by the Great Depression.

== Development ==
Founded by motorcycle enthusiast Arthur John Wheaton in 1926 using his initials 'AJW', the company began production in the maintenance workshops of the family printing works in Friernhay Street Exeter, UK. Using a high performance 996cc V-twin British Anzani engine built by Eric Burt and Archie Frazer-Nash at the British Anzani Engineering Company in Kingston upon Thames, where they also produced the v twin engine for Morgan cyclecars, Montgomery Motorcycles and OEC as well as AJW.

The full duplex tubular loop frame of the AJW Summit were specially made for AJW by engineers at the Brough Superior workshops in Haydn Road Nottingham, England. AJW motorcycles were very expensive, hand built to customers requirements and well made. The 996cc AJW Summit was capable of 161 kilometres per hour (100 mph). With an unusual aerodynamic 'torpedo' fuel tank, the engine had double exhaust pipes down each side. Enthusiast owners included Brooklands racing champions and record holders Claude Temple and Joe Wright.

When AJW began production in 1927 the range included a standard 'sportster' with single-port cylinder heads and a twin-port version but production was slow due to the hand built assembly and delays in obtaining the bought in components, including the frames and engines. Even in its best year, AJW only produced 250 motorcycles. In the Great Depression of the 1930s the market for luxury motorcycles was very limited and demand for the road going version slumped. The performance of the AJW Summit meant that despite the cost it remained popular with motorcycle racers, so the company stopped building roadsters to concentrate on developing the racing specification. This did not generate enough income, however, and production finally ended in 1931.

== See also ==
- List of motorcycles of the 1920s
