= AFW =

AFW may refer to:

- AFW (motorcycle), a 1920s German bike
- Access Fort Wayne, local produced programming for Fort Wayne, Indiana (see Allen County Public Library)
- Africa World Airlines, from its ICAO airline code
- American Furniture Warehouse, sometimes shortened to AFW, a chain of furniture stores
- Perot Field Fort Worth Alliance Airport in Texas, US (IATA airport code AFW)
