= Triumph Ricardo =

British motorcycle

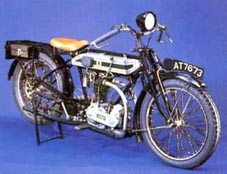
- Manufacturer: Triumph Engineering Co Ltd
- Also called: The 'Riccy'
- Production: 1921–1928
- Engine: 499cc single-cylinder four-valve ohv four-stroke
- Power: 20 bhp @ 4600 rpm
- Transmission: Triumph three-speed gearbox
- Weight: 250 pounds (110 kg) (dry)

The Triumph Ricardo was a British single-cylinder motorcycle manufactured by Triumph Engineering between 1921 and 1928. Named after engine designer Sir Harry Ricardo it featured an innovative four valve head design and was capable of over 70 mph, set three world speed records and won a gold medal in the 1923 International Six Day Trial.

== Development ==
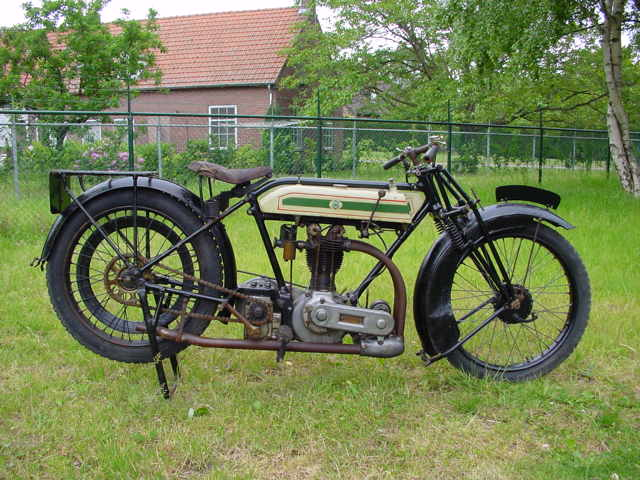
1925 Triumph Ricardo

Developed around a 499cc single-cylinder OHV four valve, four-stroke, commissioned by Triumph from engine expert Ricardo, the Triumph Ricardo was a replacement for the aging Triumph side-valves. Ricardo produced a number of prototypes aimed at reducing thermal stress on the inadequate valve materials available, while improving airflow through increased valve area. Harry Ricardo's final design had the four valves operated by the existing tappet mechanism and set a new standard for the power output possible from a 500cc single-cylinder engine, achieving over 20 bhp – the same as a 1500cc car engine of the time. Capable of 70 mph, the four-valve head allowed more efficient gas flow and the spark plug could be positioned in the middle for optimum combustion. Each pair of valves was parallel, at 90 degrees to each other, with the valve stems and springs exposed, as were the long pushrods which ran on the outside of the engine. A light alloy piston ran in a cast iron for road ( and steel cylinder for racing) barrel and the cylinder head was made of cast iron.

The rest of the cycle parts were based on Triumph's well proven Triumph Model H side-valve. This had a poor reputation for handling, however, and was not really built for the more powerful four valve engine. On later models the oil system (which had relied on a manual hand pump) was replaced with an external oil pump. The 'Riccy' continued in production as a sports model until 1928.

== Racing success ==
As well as developing the four valve engine, Harry Ricardo was also very interested in formulating new racing fuels and the effects of fuel octane on engine performance. Triumph had a poor result when three Ricardo's competed in the 1921 Isle of Man TT, with only one completed the race but a 'Model R' Fast Roadster model was entered in the 1922 Senior TT, ridden by Ricardo's assistant and fellow engine designer Frank Halford, who came 13th. Halford on a tuned Triumph Ricardo fitted with a bronze alloy cylinder head of his own design also recorded a lap of the race track at Brooklands at 68 mph, broke the Brooklands hour record at 76.74 mph the flying mile at 87.8 mph. Much of the credit went to the new racing fuel which was eventually banned.

In 1923 a 'Model R' Fast Roadster model won a gold medal in the ISDT.

== See also ==
- List of motorcycles of the 1920s
- List of Triumph motorcycles
