= Harley-Davidson Model B =

Harley-Davidson motorcycle

The single cylinder engine had been a mainstay of the Harley-Davidson line since the early days of the company's founding in 1903, but it was not until 1909 that the V-twin design was added. It was Introduced in 1926, and it disappeared from the program in 1934 and was reintroduced in 1937 as Harley-Davidson V - Twin B.

== History ==
It was introduced in 1926 and modified and modernized to meet the needs of foreign markets where it was most popular. It was followed by the lightweight Model C Harley, followed by a variety of DKW-based designs.

== See also ==
- List of Harley-Davidson motorcycles
- List of motorcycles of the 1920s
