= Charles Franklin =

Irish motorcycle designer and racer

Charles Bayly Franklin
- Franklin on an Indian Motorcycle
- Born: 1 October 1880; 1 St. Patrick's Villas, Whitworth Road, Drumcondra, Dublin, Ireland
- Died: 19 October 1932 (aged 52); 71 School Street, Springfield, Massachusetts, US
- Occupation: Engineer
- Known for: Racing Indian motorcycles at the Isle of Man Tourist Trophy, designing the Indian Scout and Indian Chief motorcycles
Charles Franklin
Motorcycle racing career statistics
Isle of Man TT career
TTs contested	7 (1908–1914)
TT wins	0
TT podiums	1 (1911, Senior TT second place)

Charles Bayly Franklin (13 October 1880 – 19 October 1932) was an Irish engineer and a motorcycle racer. He designed motorcycles for the Indian Motocycle Company, including the original Indian Scout of 1920, the original Indian Chief of 1922, and the Indian 101 Scout of 1928. Prior to this, he had been part of the Indian motorcycle team that won first, second, and third place in the 1911 Isle of Man TT, finishing in second place. Franklin was inducted into the AMA Motorcycle Hall of Fame in 2016.

== Early life ==
Franklin was born on 1 October 1880 to Lorenzo Bruce Clutterbuck Franklin, a shipwright and iron merchant, and his wife, Annie Honor Wrixon, née Bayly. He was born at 1 St. Patrick's Villas, Whitworth Road, Drumcondra, Dublin; which became 18 Whitworth Road after the road was renumbered in 1883 or 1884. Three of his siblings died from scarlet fever in the previous year, and another, a sister, died from the disease and was buried four days after he was born.

Franklin had already survived his own bout of scarlet fever when, in his teens, he contracted pneumonia and nearly died from it. Despite his illnesses, he became his parents' first child to survive to adulthood. Two of his younger brothers would also survive to adulthood.

While at St. Andrew's College, Dublin, in which he enrolled in its foundation year of 1894, he lived with his paternal grandfather, Robert Franklin. Upon leaving St. Andrew's Franklin was accepted into the civil service and began training as an electrical engineer. Upon completion of his training Franklin was appointed to the post of engineer at the power station at Rathmines.

== Motorcycling career ==
=== Ireland (1903–1916) ===
In 1903 Franklin began competing in reliability trials, hill climbs and beach racing. On 24 September 1904 he participated in the Auto Cycle Club's annual race meeting at Crystal Palace, London; his first track event and his first event outside Ireland. He won one of the five heats and finished third in the final. His first motorcycles were Belgian FN single-cylinder machines, which he rode in the reliability trials and beach speed trials in 1903 and 1904 and at the 1904 Crystal Palace event. As at May 1905 he had also ridden Humber and Royal Progress motorcycles.

On 29 May 1905, Franklin competed as a private entrant at the Auto Cycle Club's trial on the Isle of Man on a "special" with a JAP V-twin engine in a Chater-Lea frame. The trial was used to select Britain's team for the Coupe International races of 1905. Only Ariel rider J. S. Campbell and Matchless rider (and co-owner) Harry Collier finished the trial; Franklin was selected as the third team member based on his speed and consistency during the trial. His participation in the 1905 Coupe International made him the first Irishman to participate in international motorcycle competition. Franklin competed with the British team in the 1906 Coupe International on another JAP special, this time with Harry Collier and his brother Charlie on Matchlesses.

Discussions during the team's return from the 1906 Coupe International on the shortcomings of the organisation of the race led to the creation of the Isle of Man Tourist Trophy, which was first run the next year. Franklin entered the inaugural 1907 Tourist Trophy, but withdrew his entry two weeks before the race meet.

Franklin entered every Isle of Man T.T. race from 1908 to 1914. When he finished, he finished in the top ten, but he did not finish in 1910 and 1912. His best finish in the Isle of Man T.T. was second place, where he was part of the Indian team that finished first, second, and third.

Franklin began racing Indian motorcycles in 1910, and competed on one in the Tourist Trophy in May of that year. The riders of Indians at that race had persistent tyre problems; Franklin and three other Indian riders had tyre failures and did not finish. That August Franklin left his job at the Rathmines power station and became a dealer in Indian motorcycles. He rode and tuned Indians exclusively from then on. In June 1912, he rode an Indian eight-valve model at Brooklands to become the first man to cover 300 miles in 300 minutes.

Franklin was recruited into the Indian company in late 1914 and tasked with establishment of an Indian depot in Dublin. The depot had opened by May 1915. The imposition of the McKenna duties in September 1915 led to the closing of Indian's Dublin depot in October 1916. Franklin, the manager of the depot, was given a position in the Indian's design department at their headquarters in Massachusetts, and left for the United States in November 1916.

In June 1916, in his last race in Ireland, Franklin rode a Featherweight Model K two-stroke single, winning the prize for best performance by a motorcycle under 300 cc.

=== United States (1916–1932) ===
Although Franklin has been credited with the design of the 1917 Model O as one of his earliest assignments, it is not known for certain who designed this model and Franklin himself had only been at the factory for three months when it first went on sale at Indian dealerships in February 1917. A lightweight motorcycle with a 15.7 cubic inches (257 cc) flat-twin engine, this model was not successful and went out of production in 1919. Franklin certainly developed a high performance version of Charles Gustafson's Powerplus engine, to the extent that the side-valve engine became the main design used in American high-performance motorcycles, supplanting more expensive overhead valve, multiple valve, and overhead camshaft designs used earlier on racing motorcycles, and persisting well beyond World War II in Class C racing in the United States.

Franklin then designed the 1920 Scout, a mid-sized motorcycle with a 37 cubic inches (610 cc) engine. Design improvements over Indian's larger motorcycles included a gearbox bolted to the engine and driven by helical-cut gears instead of a primary chain. Franklin's 1922 Indian Chief used a larger version of the Scout's drivetrain design. Compared to the Powerplus-powered motorcycle it replaced, the Chief had dual camshafts, gear drive similar to that of the Scout, and a wet clutch.

After designing the 1925 Indian Prince, a single-cylinder 21 cubic inches (340 cc) lightweight motorcycle which preceded Harley-Davidson's equivalent single-cylinder models by one year Franklin generally approved Arthur Lemon's development of the Ace four-cylinder motorcycle design, which Indian acquired in 1927, and he redesigned the Scout for 1928. The resulting Indian 401 four-cylinder motorcycle and Indian 101 Scout had the same frame geometry, which, in the lighter 101 Scout, resulted in exceptional handling and stability. Franklin later designed a three-wheeled utility vehicle, the 1931 Dispatch Tow, based on the Model 101 frame.

Franklin also designed highly successful racing motors in a range of valve configurations from side-valve to overhead-valve (both 2-valve and 4-valve) and overhead-cam.

== Death ==
In the second half of 1931, Franklin took a leave of absence from Indian to rest and recover his health, although at first he continued to work from a drawing office at his home. He died from complications due to intestinal cancer during the night of 19 October 1932. He left behind his wife Annie (a.k.a. Nancye), whom he had married in Dublin in July 1907, and his daughter Phyllis, born in Dublin in September 1908. Nancye and Phyllis Franklin had arrived in the United States in May 1920.
