= BSA Model L =

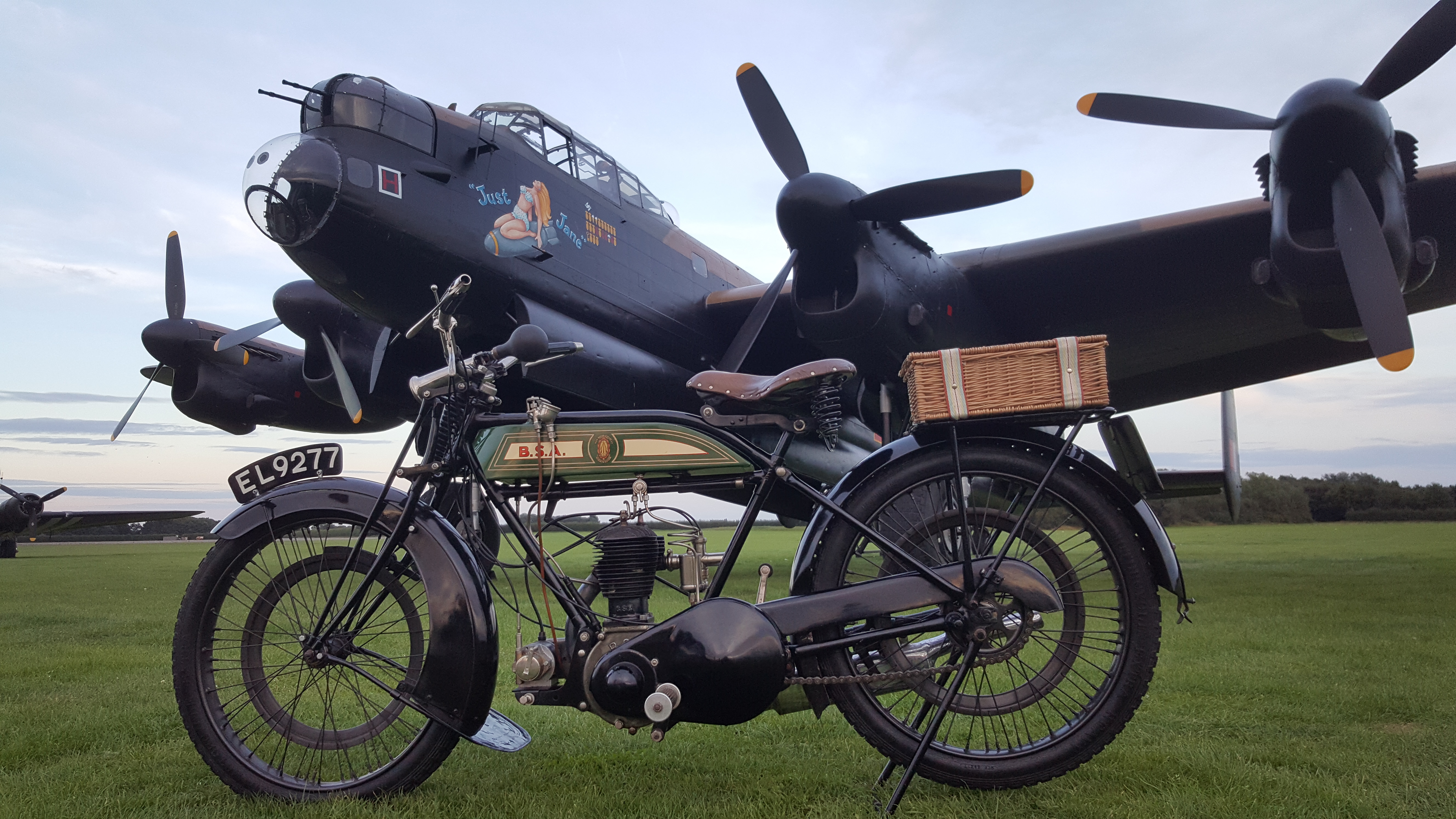
- Manufacturer: BSA
- Production: 1923
- Engine: 349 cc single cylinder side valve
- Transmission: three-speed, hand change gearbox to a chain final drive
- Wheelbase: 55 inches (140 cm)

The BSA Model L is a British motorcycle manufactured by Birmingham Small Arms Company (BSA) at their factory in Armoury Road, Small Heath, Birmingham from 1923/1924.

== Development ==
Launched in 1923 were BSA's new 350cc sidevalve was designated the Model L and fitted with a three-speed, hand-change gearbox and chain final drive.

This BSA was introduced as one of the last flat-tank models, the Model L that was available with either a side-valve or an overhead-valve 349cc, four stroke engine with bore and stroke of 72mm x 85.5mm. The overhead-valve model was the company's first such model but it otherwise shared all of its running gear with its side-valve stablemate including a three-speed, hand-change, constant-mesh gearbox, an Amac carburettor and chain final drive. Front and rear braking was achieved by a friction pad being applied to a dummy rim built into the wheel spokes – not an uncommon practise on veteran machines and derived from building similar brakes onto a belt-drive rim. Although lubrication was achieved with a mechanical oil pump, the rider could adjust the oil flow depending upon the engine's duty conditions via an adjuster mounted on the tank that included a sight glass through which to observe the flow rate.

In its first year, the side-valve Model L was immediately successful. According to Pitman's ‘Book of the BSA’: “To the sporting solo rider who asks for a ‘go anywhere’ mount, its records in the Scottish Six Day Trial and the International trials in Sweden in 1923 stand as recommendation.” When new in the UK, a side-valve Model L cost £47/10s.

== Racing Success ==
The BSA Model L set records in the Scottish Six Days Trial and the International Trials in Sweden in 1923.

== See also ==
- List of motorcycles of the 1920s
