= AJS Model D =

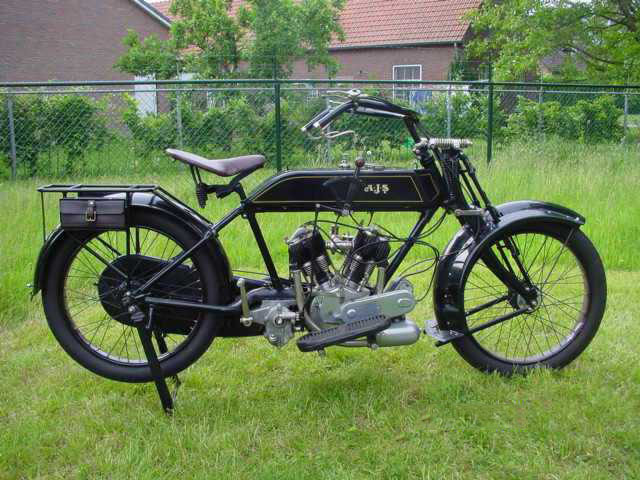
- Manufacturer: A. J. Stevens & Co. Ltd Wolverhampton
- Successor: AJS Model E
- Engine: 748 cc side valve V-Twin
- Power: 6bhp
- Transmission: chain to three-speed countershaft gearbox.
- Weight: 276 pounds (125 kg) (dry)

The AJS Model D is a British motorcycle made by A. J. Stevens & Co. Ltd in Wolverhampton between 1912 and 1925. With production halted by the First World War AJS managed to develop the Model D into a popular sidecar machine and it was eventually replaced by the larger capacity AJS Model E.

== Development ==
In 1905 the Stevens Motor Manufacturing Company built a V-twin motorcycle powered by a JA Prestwich Industries Ltd motor, with leading-link front forks and a swinging fork at the rear. A new company, A J Stevens & Co (AJS), was founded in 1909 to manufacture motorcycles and at the 1912 London Motorcycle show they launched the 698cc side valve AJS Model D. Featuring cylinders at 50 degrees and chain drive to a three speed countershaft gearbox with a hand gear change, the original engines had quickly removable cylinder heads but after problems with oil leaks a more permanent head was specified for 1913. The side valve engine was lubricated by a 'total loss' system operated by a hand pump. Ignition was achieved with a Splitdorf Magneto and the fuel system featured an Amac automatic carburettor. The silencer was made from cast aluminium and the frame was a tubular 'diamond' construction, with Brampton bi-flex front forks, which had an unusual two way movement, and quickly detachable wheels. The sidecar version of the Model D proved particularly successful and became so popular that AJS were not able to meet demand.

== First World war ==
The outbreak of the First World War in 1914 nearly saw the end of the company as a motorcycle producer as they failed to secure motorcycle contracts for the armed forces and the factory was turned over to produce munitions for the war effort instead. In 1916 the Ministry of Munitions banned production of motorcycles except for military use, but in 1917 they needed to fulfil an order from Russia for large numbers of motorcycles and AJS were contracted to build 1100 6 hp military motorcycles, enabling them to continue development of the Model D despite the restrictions.

== Post War resurgence ==
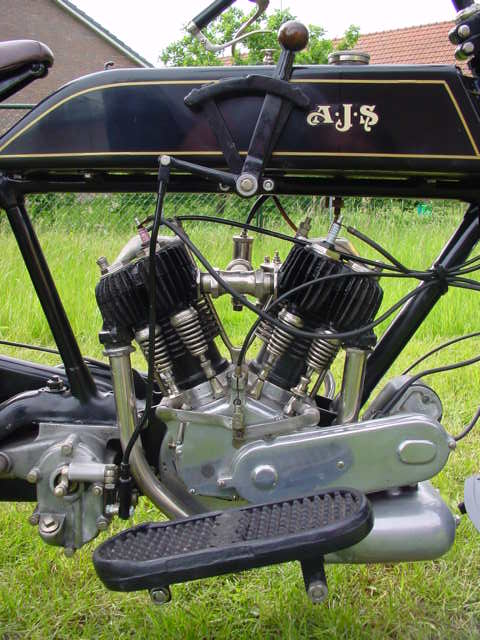
AJS Model D engine

After the war ended in November 1918 and the Ministry restrictions were lifted, AJS restarted motorcycle production at a new factory at Graisley Hill in Wolverhampton and the Model D was resurrected with the capacity increased to 748cc and a new design of saddle and fuel tank. The idea of detachable cylinder heads was reintroduced with a cross strap and tie bolts to help ensure that they remained oil tight. At the Graisley Hill works AJS had their own foundry, enamelling facility, frame works and press as well as the motorcycle production line. Except for a few electrical and rubber components, the whole of the Model D was made in-house and the company also supplied engines to Brough Superior, OK Supreme and the Morgan Motor Company.

An updated 7 hp version of the Model D was launched at the Olympia Motorcycle Show in November 1920. In 1923 a cheaper version called the Model D1 was introduced and 1924 was the best year for sales, which continued to outstrip the capacity of the factory despite increasing the Graiseley Hill works to 230,000 square feet.

== Model E ==
The Model D remained in production until 1925 and became popular as a sidecar machine. In 1925 it was developed into the AJS Model E which had the capacity increased further to 799cc and a new design of frame to allow a lower seat height. The Model E was designed for sidecar use and was later increased to 990cc before production ended again on the outbreak of the Second World War in 1939.

== See also ==
- List of motorcycles of the 1910s
- List of motorcycles of the 1920s
