= BSA Sloper =

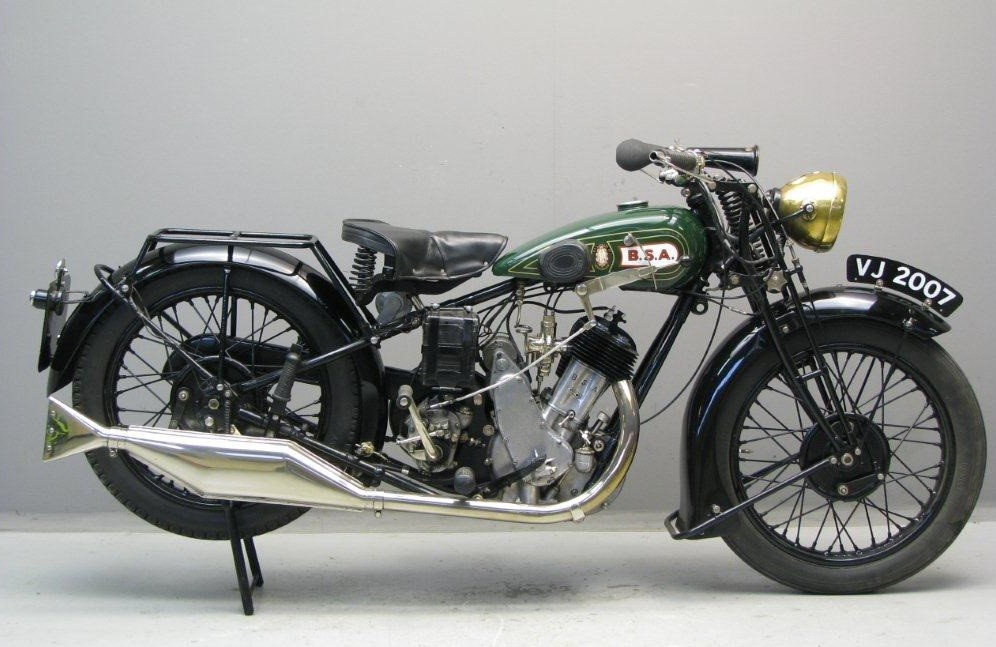
- 1929 BSA Model S29 De Luxe SV 500cc
- Manufacturer: BSA
- Production: 1927-1935
- Class: Standard
- Engine: 493 cc (30.1 cu in) OHV
- Bore / stroke: 80 mm × 98 mm (3.1 in × 3.9 in)
- Top speed: 70–75 mph (113–121 km/h) (Super Sports version)
- Frame type: Duplex cradle
- Brakes: Drum front & rear Linked front-rear from rear pedal.

The BSA S-Series, most commonly known as the BSA Sloper, was a series of motorcycles produced by the Birmingham Small Arms Company (BSA) of Birmingham, England, from 1927 to 1935.

Launched in 1927, the motorcycle featured a slanted 493cc overhead valve engine and a saddle tank that enabled a low seating position, improving the centre of gravity and handling. It was designated as the new S-series, with an engine capacity of 493cc for UK road tax reasons. The S-series designation applied to all BSA engines at the time with the same bore and stroke regardless of whether the cylinder was sloped or vertical or if the engine had an overhead valve (OHV) or side-valve (SV) configuration. However, Sloper became the term used by motorcyclists and hence adopted by BSA for marketing. The Sloper range remained much the same until its demise in 1935. Each model was designated with the two numbers of the year produced, hence the S31 was produced in 1931 and appeared in the BSA catalogue for that season. Thus in 1931, the standard OHV Sloper was S31-9, the De-Luxe was S31-10 while the side valve Sloper was S31-7.

The first models featured a 493cc (80x98mm) single ported cylinder-head, topped by a cast-aluminium enclosure for the rockers, with exposed valve springs. Alongside the cast barrel were plated tubes to cover the pushrods. Easy cam contours and wide bases on the tappets ensured no associated valve clack, meaning that the Sloper was regarded by many as one of the smoothest and quietest of sporting 500cc machines. The large crankcase accommodated both a large and heavy flywheel, and a separate oil feed tank controlled by a hand meter.

Early models had a duplex-frame and three-speed gearbox, but soon the top tube was replaced by an I-frame forging to support a new steering head. By the 1929/30 the engine carried a twin-port head, and the OHV joined by a less-popular side-valve model; these models also had extra chrome. From 1932 all were equipped by a 4-speed gearbox. From 1930 there was an optional sporting kit for £10, including a high-compression piston, hardened valves and springs, and a racing sparkplug, but the company noted that there were few buyers. The model ceased production in 1935, by which time there were only two models, an overhead valve and a sidevalve, both of 595cc.

The large heavy flywheel and easy cams gave the Sloper a slow purposeful tick over, which was supplemented by large fishtail silencers. Its engine rhythm, together with its easy handling may have added to choice of its name. Cruising speed was 55 miles per hour (89 km/h), with a top speed of around 75 miles per hour (121 km/h).

== See also ==
- List of motorcycles of the 1920s
