= Triumph Model H =

British motorcycle made from 1915 to 1923

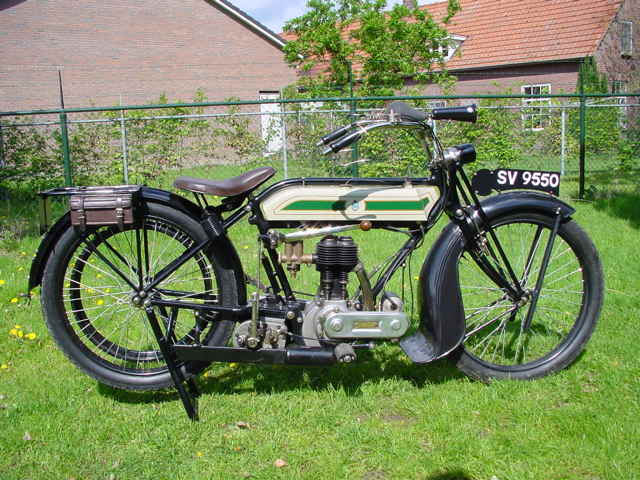
- A 1922 Triumph Model H (2005)
- Manufacturer: Triumph Engineering Co Ltd
- Also called: 'The Trusty', Type H
- Production: 1915–1923
- Engine: 550 cc (34 cu in) air-cooled four-stroke single-cylinder (4 hp)
- Bore / stroke: 85 mm × 97 mm (3.3 in × 3.8 in)
- Power: 4 bhp

The Triumph Model H (also known as the 'Type H' and 'the Trusty') is a British motorcycle made by Triumph Engineering Co Ltd in Coventry, England. A total of 57,000 Triumph Model H motorcycles were made from 1915 until production ended in 1923.

== Development ==
At the start of the First World War in 1914 the British Government needed effective communications with front line troops and replaced messengers on horses with despatch riders on motorcycles. A number of models were tested for suitability and the Triumph Model H was selected. With the rear wheel driven by a belt, the Model H was fitted with a 499 cc air-cooled four-stroke single-cylinder engine. It was also the first Triumph not to be fitted with pedals, so was a true motorcycle. During the War, the Model H was a one of the most popular motorcycles in the French Army.

Engine differences from the previous Model A included a single cam wheel with two cams replacing separate cam wheels for the inlet and exhaust valve, and new design of cylinder casting. Valve head diameter was enlarged and the valves were spaced further apart. The Model H was fitted with a Sturmey-Archer three-speed countershaft gearbox operated by a hand gear change lever.

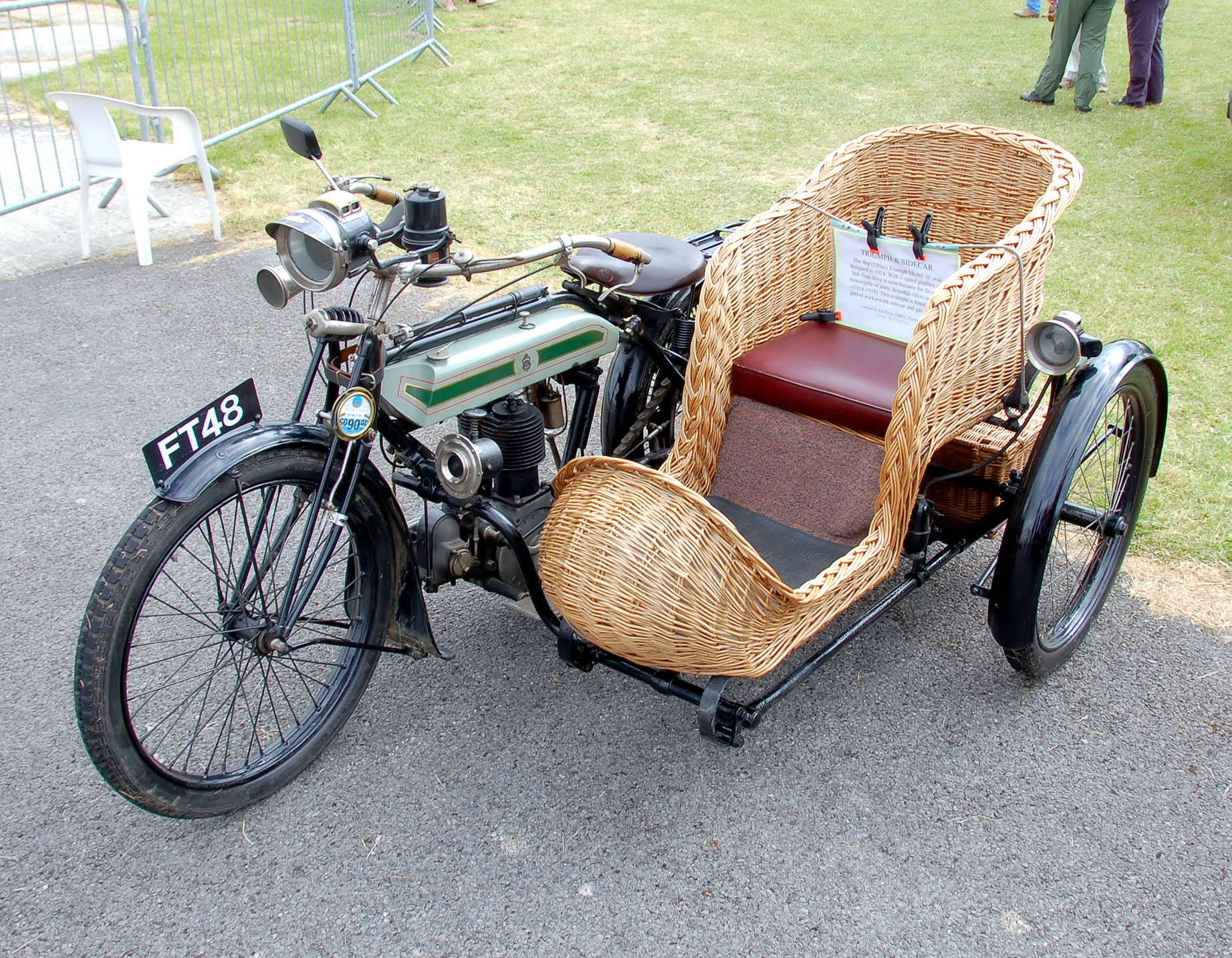
Triumph Model H (2009)

More than 30,000 Triumph Model H motorcycles had been produced by the end of the war in 1918. The Triumph Engineering Co Ltd had been using the advertising slogan Trusty Triumph since 1910 and the Model H became known as 'The Trusty' as it proved reliable in wartime conditions, despite a weakness in the front fork spring. This was prone to break on rough ground, so despatch riders would strap a leather belt around it as a precaution.

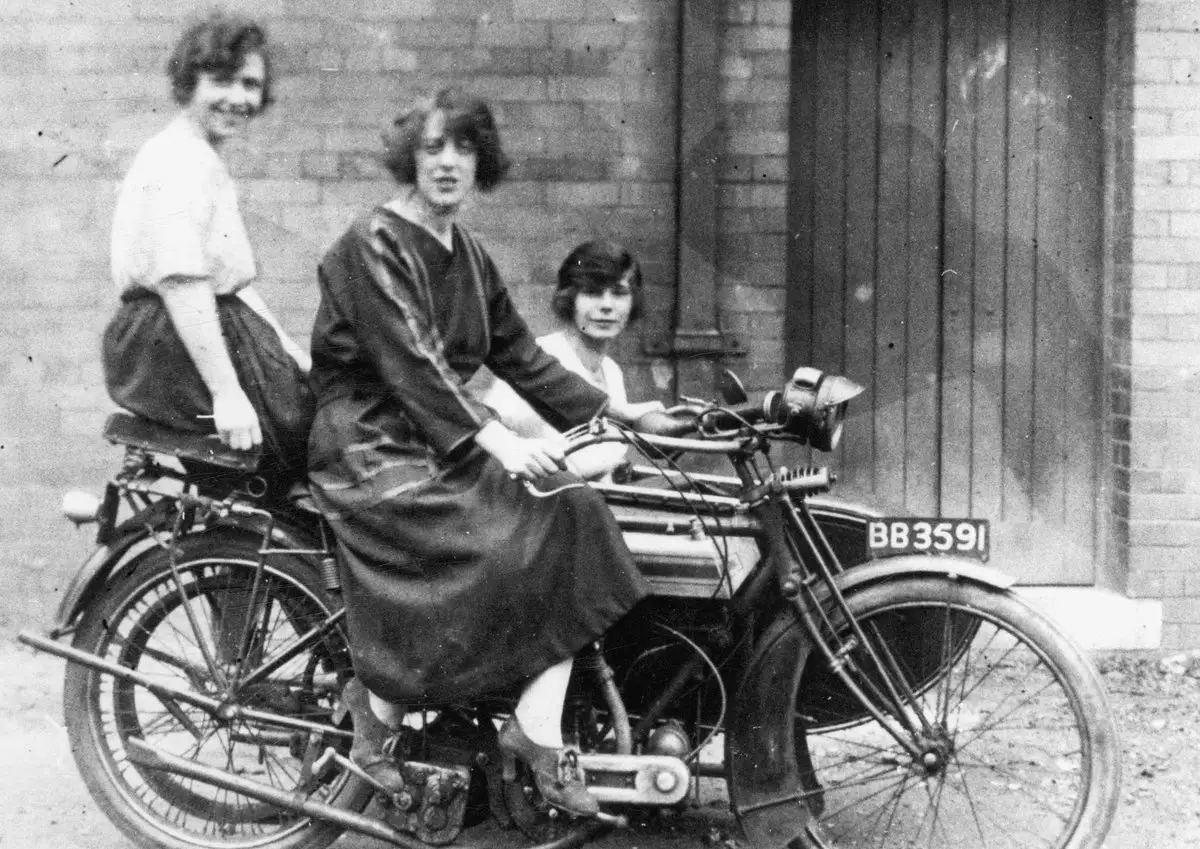
Model H with sidecar and three women

After the war, the motorcycle didn't have enough speed for racing, which was one of the principal markets for motorcycles at the time, so Triumph moved on to a motorcycle designed by Harry Ricardo, known as the Model R Roadster. When the Model H was discontinued in 1923 a total of 57,000 had been produced.

== See also ==
- Norton 16H
- Triumph Engineering Co Ltd
- List of Triumph motorcycles
- Phelon & Moore
- List of motorcycles of the 1910s
- List of motorcycles of the 1920s
