= Abako (motorcycle) =

- Manufacturer: Abako
- Production: 1923–1925
- Class: Light motorcycle
- Engine: 129 cc single-cylinder two-stroke
- Transmission: 2- or 3-speed Sturmey-Archer, chain drive

The Abako was a small 129 cc single-cylinder motorcycle built in Nuremberg, Germany, between 1923 and 1925. It was powered by Abako's own two-stroke deflector-type three-port engine, with two- and three-speed Sturmey-Archer gearboxes and chain drive to the rear wheel.
