= Indian Chief (motorcycle) =

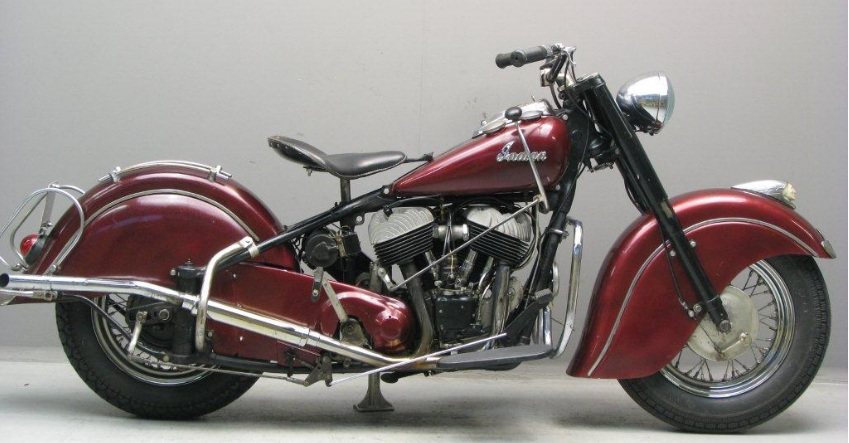
- 1950 Indian Chief Black Hawk
- Manufacturer: Hendee Manufacturing Company, Indian Motocycle Manufacturing Company
- Production: 1922-1942, 1946-1948, 1950-1953, 1999-2003 (IMCOA); 2006-present (IMC)
- Assembly: Springfield, Massachusetts, United States Gilroy, CA 1999-2003 Kings Mountain N.C 2006-2011 Spirit Lake, IA 2012- present
- Predecessor: Indian Powerplus
- Class: Cruiser
- Engine: Four-stroke 42° V-twin engine, 61 cu in (1,000 cc) (1922-1928); 74 cu in (1,210 cc) (1923-1942, 1946-1948); 80 cu in (1,300 cc) (1950-1953)
- Bore / stroke: 61 cu. in.: 3 1/8 in × 3 31/32 in (79 mm × 101 mm); 74 cu. in.: 3 1/4 in × 4 7/16 in (83 mm × 113 mm); 80 cu. in.: 3 1/4 in × 4 13/16 in (83 mm × 122 mm)
- Suspension: Front: 1922-1942: trailing link fork 1946-1948: girder fork 1950-1953: telescopic fork Rear: 1922-1939: none, rigid 1940-1942, 1946-1948, 1950-1953: plunger
- Wheelbase: 60.5 in (1,540 mm)

The Indian Chief is a motorcycle that was built by the Hendee Manufacturing Company and the subsequent Indian Motocycle Company from 1922 to the end of the company's production in 1953, and again from 1999 to present. The Chief was Indian's "big twin", a larger, more powerful motorcycle than the more agile Scout used in competition and sport riding.

When Indian resumed civilian production after World War II, they revived only the Chief line. Production of Indian motorcycles ended with the last Chief made in 1953, then resumed again in 1999.

== Origin ==
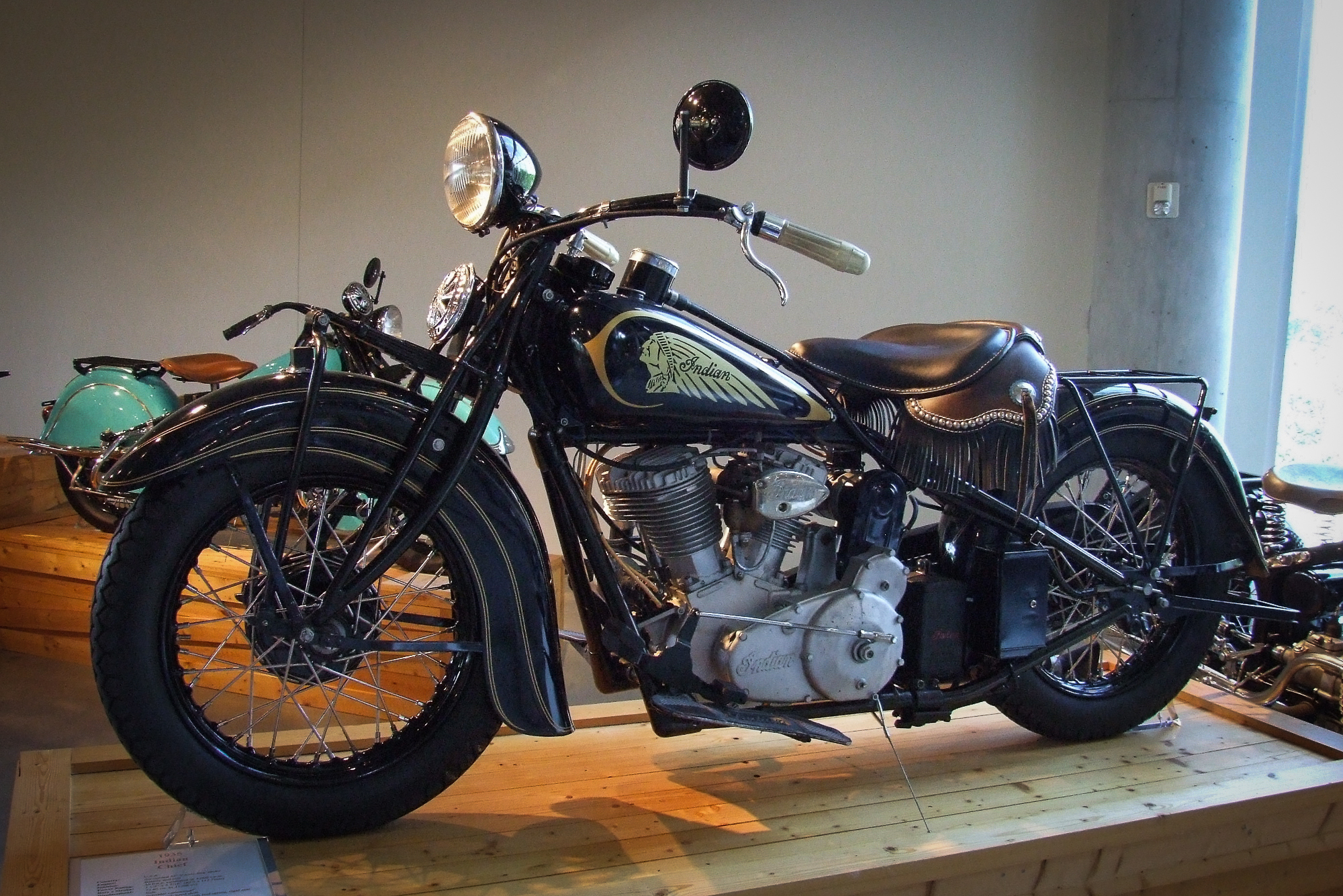
1935 Indian Chief at the Barber Vintage Motorsports Museum

The Chief was introduced for 1922 to replace the Powerplus, although the Powerplus was continued under the "Standard" name until 1923. Designed by Charles B. Franklin, the Chief had design features similar to Franklin's earlier Scout, including the gearbox bolted to the engine casings and primary drive by gear train. The Chief had a bore of 3 1/8 inches (79 mm) and a stroke of 3 31/32 inches (101 mm), giving a displacement of 61 cubic inches, as the Powerplus/Standard had. Unlike the Powerplus/Standard, the Chief was not offered with rear suspension.

The Big Chief was introduced for 1923. The engine of the Big Chief was bored to 3 1/4 inches (83 mm) and stroked to 4 7/16 inches (113 mm), giving a displacement of 74 cubic inches. The Big Chief had mainly been offered for sidecar use, but was popular with solo riders as well. The smaller-engined Chief was discontinued in 1928, partly to accommodate increased production of the Model 101 Scout.

== Development ==
For 1940, the Chief frame was modified to include plunger rear suspension. In the same year, all Indian models were restyled with large, decorative fenders.

The Indian 340-B was a military motorcycle based on the Chief. The 340-B had open fenders and was usually supplied with a sidecar. Customers included the US. military, which received about 3,000, and France, which received 5,000 before it surrendered to Germany in 1940.

== Post-war ==
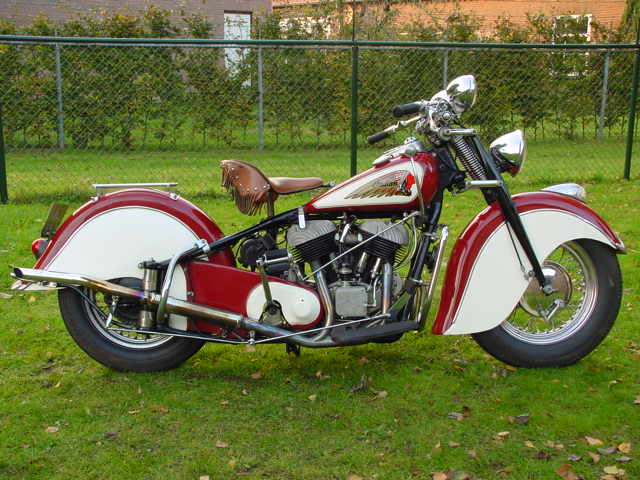
1948 Indian Chief

After World War II, the Chief was the only pre-war Indian model to be manufactured. The leaf-sprung trailing-link fork used before the war was replaced by girder forks similar to those used by the military 841 and the Sport Scout.

No Chiefs were made for 1949. The Chief returned to the lineup for 1950, with telescopic forks replacing the girder forks and with the engine stroked to 80 cu in (1,300 cc). Production of the Chief ended in 1953, upon which Indian ceased production of motorcycles.

== Later Chiefs ==
=== Brockhouse ===
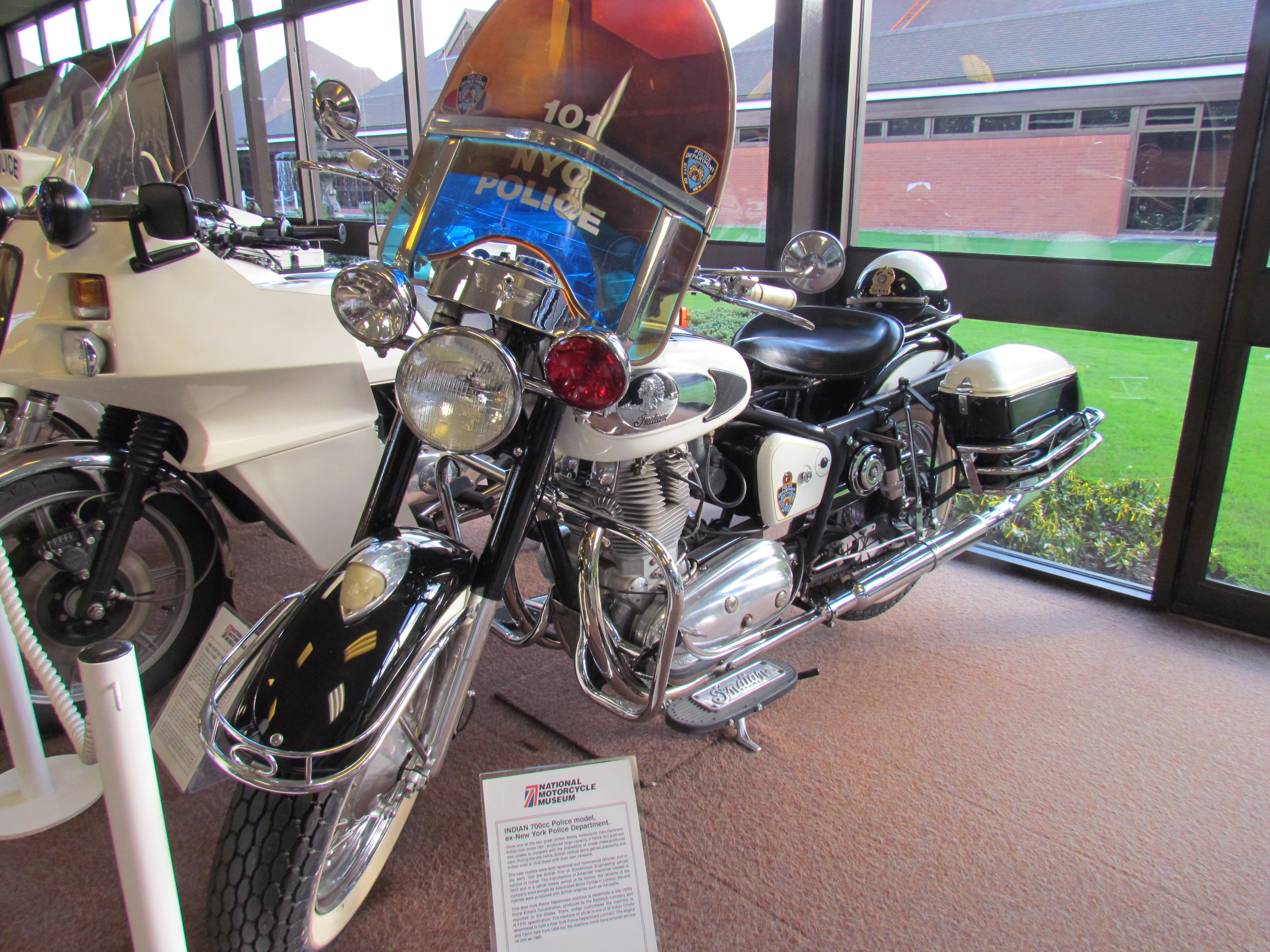
1958 Royal Enfield Meteor, badged as an Indian Police Chief

In 1959 Brockhouse Engineering, owners of the Indian trademarks and distribution network, sold a rebadged Royal Enfield Meteor badged as an Indian Chief. There was a police version called the Police Chief.

=== 1999-2013 ===
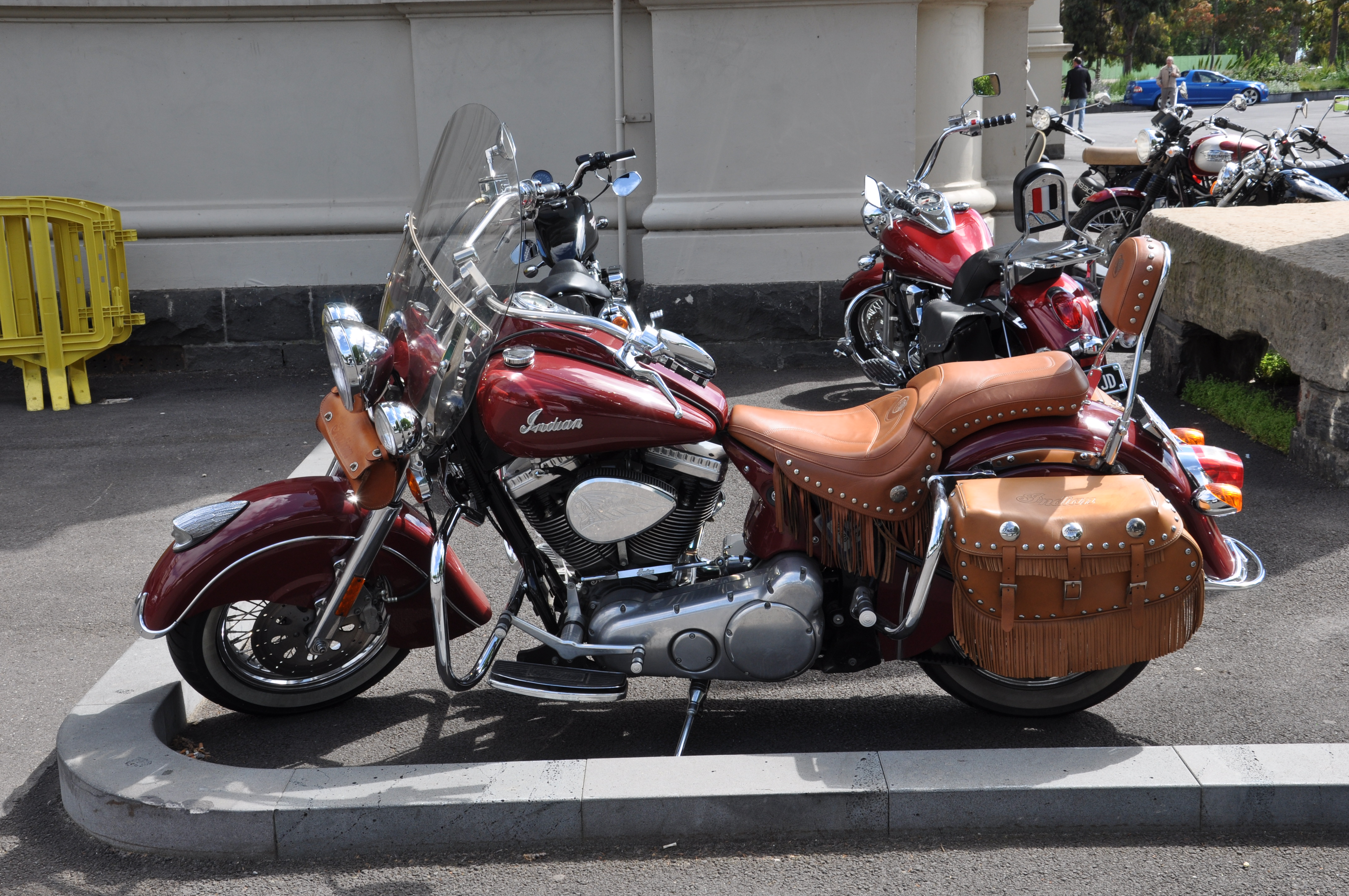
Post-1998 Indian Chief

The Indian Motorcycle Company of America (IMCA) manufactured Indian Chief motorcycles in Gilroy, California, from 1999 to 2003. These initially used clones of Harley-Davidson Evolution engines built from S&S parts. Later versions used the in-house "Powerplus" engine.

A new company began production of Indian Chiefs in 2006 in King's Mountain, North Carolina. These were updated versions of the IMCA Chief. Production of the Chief was moved to Spirit Lake, Iowa, after Polaris Industries bought the company.

=== 2014-present ===
In 2014, Indian released a new Indian Chief motorcycle with a new engine. Nothing on the 2014 Chief is based on the earlier Chief bought from the King's Mountain company.
