= Indian Prince =

Single-cylinder motorcycle produced from 1925 to 1928

The Indian Prince is a motorcycle manufactured by the Hendee Manufacturing Company from 1925 to 1928. An entry-level single-cylinder motorcycle, the Prince was restyled after its first year and discontinued after four years.

The frame and forks of the Prince were revived in 1933 and used with V-twin engines to form the Motoplane and the Pony Scout.

== Design and production ==
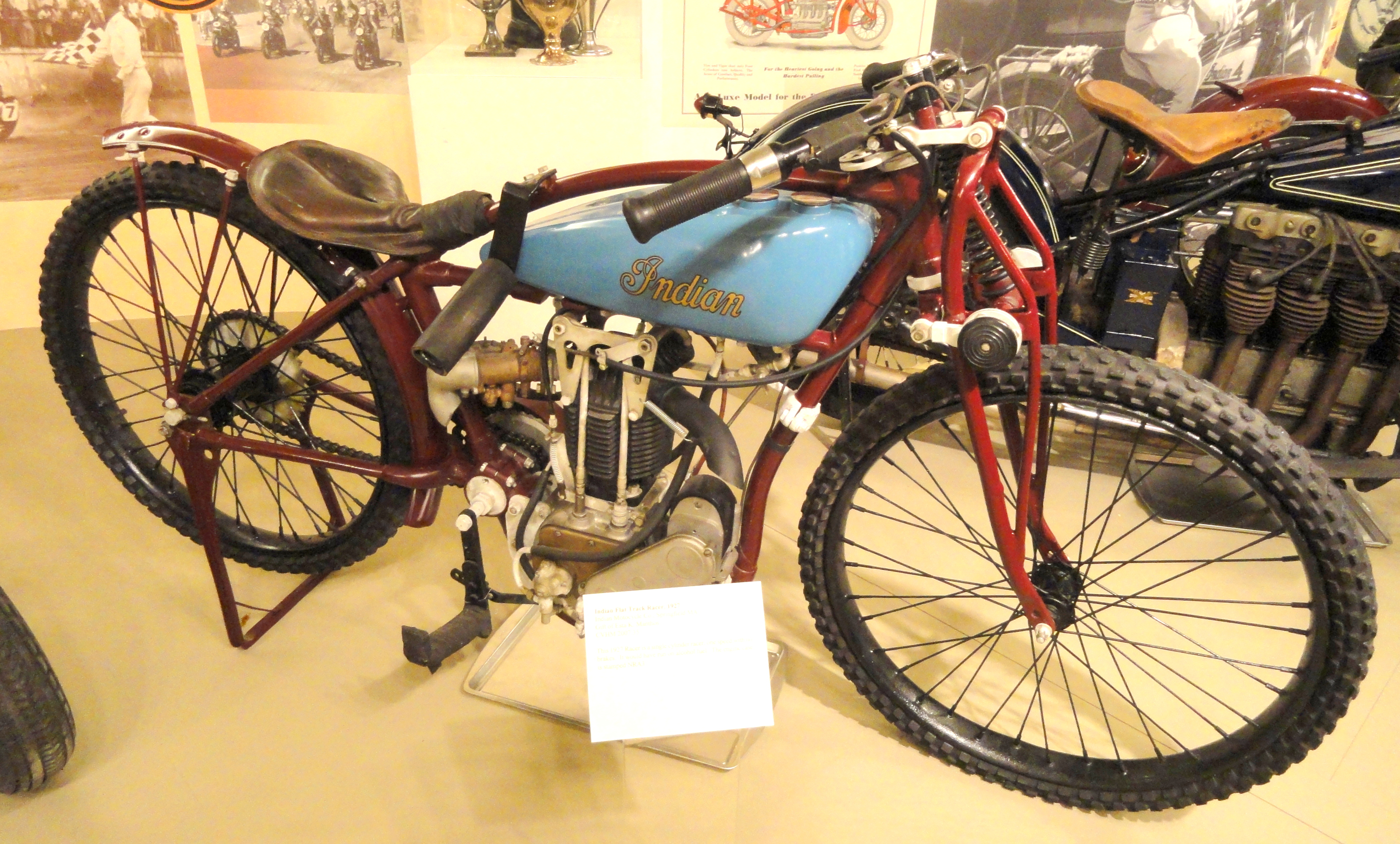
1927 flat-track racer based on an Indian Prince

The Prince was designed by Charles B. Franklin and began production in 1925. It was a single-cylinder motorcycle for beginners and for export. The 1925 Prince gear box was separate from the engine, the frame under the tank has a tube which the tank is bolted too, the gas tank is mounted from underside of tank, front and back it was a wedge-shaped fuel tank. The Prince was redesigned for 1926 with a separate gearbox and a fuel tank similar in shape to that of the contemporary Scout. Both versions used coil-sprung girder forks instead of the leaf-sprung trailing link forks used on the contemporary Chief and Scout. A front brake was added in 1928, the last year of production.

== Legacy ==
Harley-Davidson began production of their single-cylinder motorcycle for 1926 and continued them until 1934.

In 1933, the Prince frame and forks were revived for use in the Motoplane and Pony Scout V-twin motorcycles. The Pony Scout was later renamed the Junior Scout and continued until the beginning of World War II. Girder forks were used on the 1934-1942 Sport Scout and on the 1945-1948 Chief.
