= Indian Scout (motorcycle) =

Motorcycle

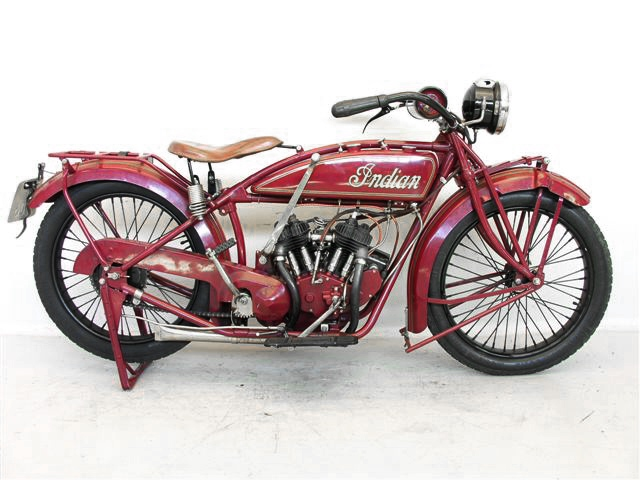
- 1920 Indian Scout 600cc (37ci)
- Manufacturer: Indian Motocycle Company
- Production: 1919–1949
- Engine: 600-745-500 cc V-twin

The Indian Scout is a motorcycle built by the Indian Motocycle Company from 1920 to 1949. It rivaled the Chief as Indian's most important model. The 101 Scout, made from 1928 to 1931, has been called the best motorcycle Indian ever made. A second line of Scouts, with heavier frames, was introduced in 1932 alongside the Standard Scout, which replaced the 101 Scout and shared its frame with the Chief and the Four. The small-displacement Scout and the Sport Scout, introduced in 1934, were continued until the end of civilian production in 1942. Military versions of both models were used by US and other Allied forces during World War II.

Apart from fifty examples of the 648, a special racing version of the Sport Scout, the Scout was not continued after World War II. In 1949 an all-new motorcycle, with an overhead valve straight-twin engine, was called the Scout; it was enlarged and renamed the Warrior in 1950.

Between 2001 and 2003, the Indian Motorcycle Company of America, based in Gilroy, California, built a Scout model using proprietary engine and transmission parts.

== The first Scouts (1920–1927) ==
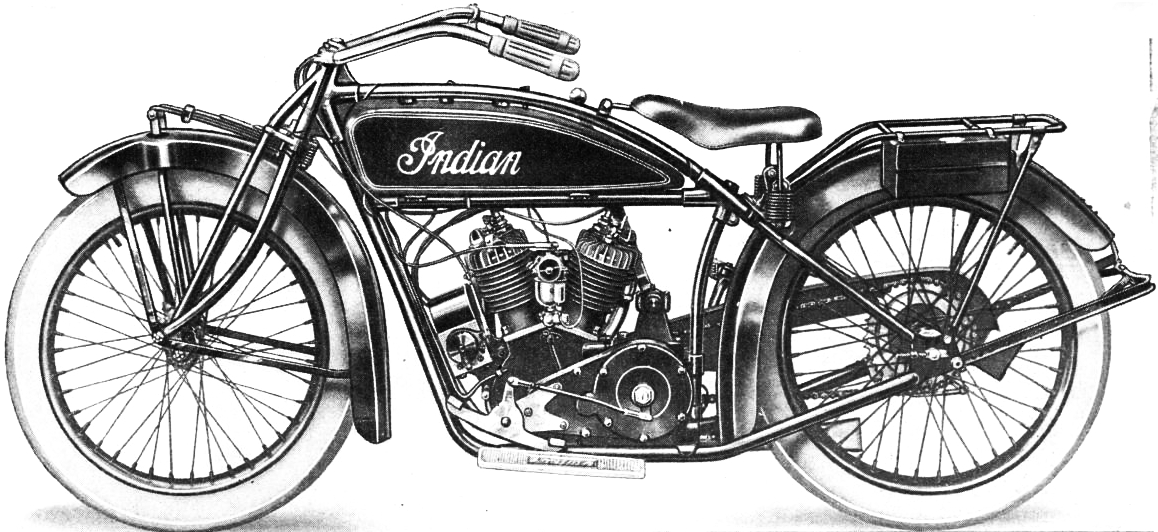
Indian Scout. Model G-20

Designed by Charles B. Franklin, the Scout was introduced in October 1919 as a 1920 model. The Scout had a sidevalve V-twin engine with its transmission bolted to the engine casing, allowing a geared primary drive - the only American v-twin to use this maintenance-free system. The Scout engine initially displaced 606 cc (37 cu in), but the engine size was increased to 745 cc (45 cu in) in 1927 in response to the popularity of the Excelsior Super X. In early 1928, a front brake was added to the Scout.

== 101 Scout (1928–1931) ==
Indian 101 Scout
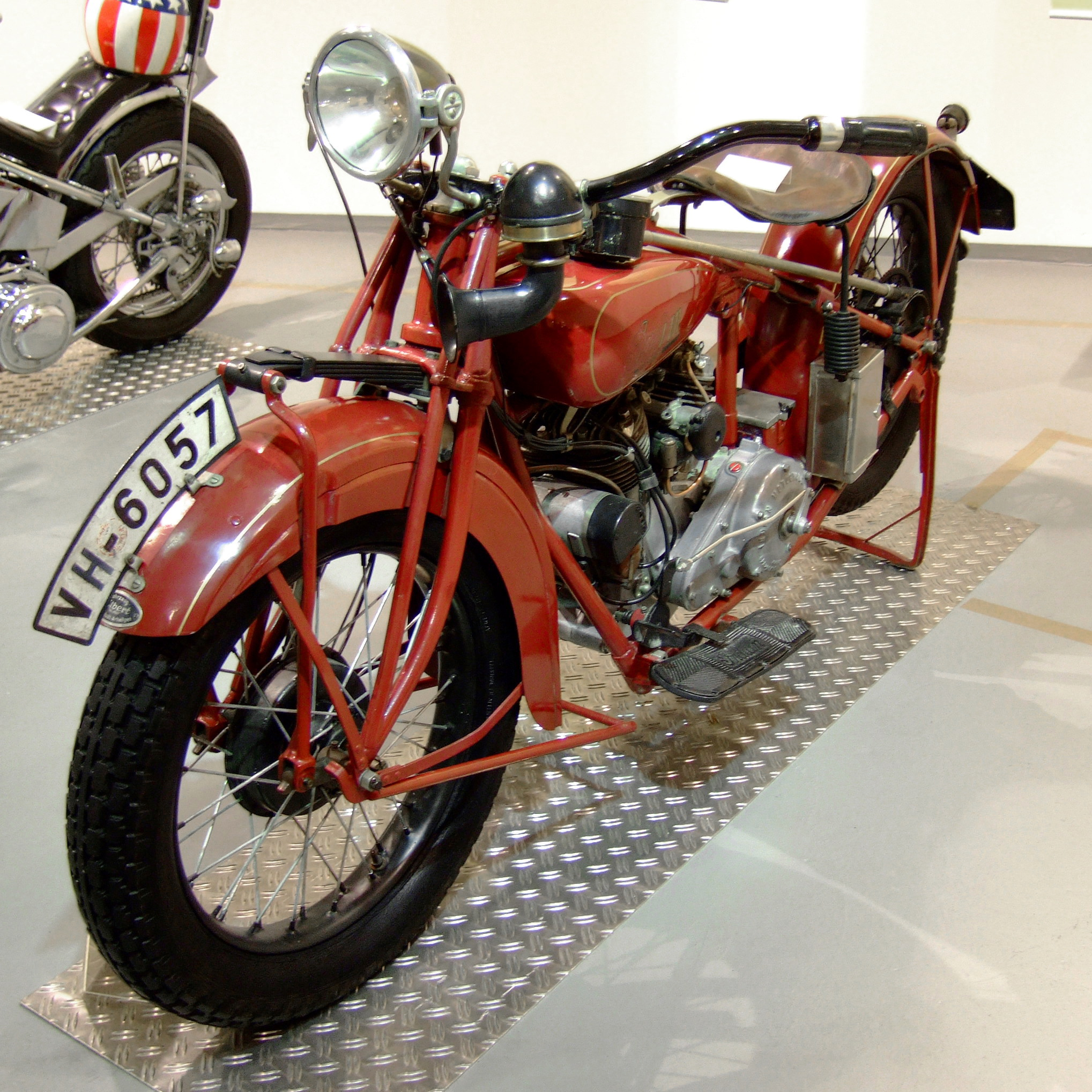
- Manufacturer: Indian Motocycle Manufacturing Company
- Predecessor: 1927 Indian Scout (original frame)
- Successor: 1932 Indian Scout (Chief frame)
- Engine: 37 cu in (610 cc) or 45 cu in (740 cc) 42° V-twin
- Bore / stroke: 37 cu in: 2 3/4 in × 3 1/16 in (70 mm × 78 mm); 45 cu in: 2 7/8 in × 3 1/2 in (73 mm × 89 mm)
- Power: 37 cu in: n/a 45 cu in: 18 bhp (13 kW)
- Transmission: Three-speed
- Suspension: Front: Trailing arm, leaf spring Rear: None, rigid
- Brakes: Front: Internal expanding shoes Rear: 1928-30 External contracting bands, 1931 internal expanding shoes
- Tires: 18" on clincher rims 1928, drop center rims 1929-31
- Wheelbase: 57 1/8 in (1,450 mm)

In mid 1928 the Scout Series 101 replaced the original Scout. Designed by Charles B. Franklin, who had designed the original Scout, the 101 Scout had a new frame with more fork rake, a longer wheelbase, and a lower seat height. The geometry of the 101 Scout wheelbase, steering head angle and rear sub-frame were all adopted from the new Indian 401 model which was under development at the same time. The standard Scout 101 was available with a 45 cu in (740 cc) engine, but it was also available with a 37 cu in (610 cc) engine from the original Scout, although this was rarely advertised.

The 101 Scout was noted for its handling and was popular with racers, hillclimbers, and trick riders.

The economic hardship of the Great Depression pushed Indian to the brink of bankruptcy, and the company was purchased by the DuPont family. In 1931, it was decided to rationalize production by designing a new frame that, with some detail variations, would be used across their entire, new-for-1932 model range of Scout, Chief and Four. Thus the 101 Scout was discontinued, as its unique chassis was as expensive to produce as the 74 cu in (1,210 cc) Chief, and therefore had a small profit margin.

=== Legacy of the 101 ===
The 101 Scout has been called the best motorcycle Indian ever made.

Enthusiasts have differing views on the replacement of the 101 Scout. Fans of Indian's technical achievements acclaim the 101 Scout as the pinnacle of Indian technology, while fans of classic Indian styling hail its replacement for bringing classic Chief styling to the Scout line. The 101 is still used in wall of death stunt exhibitions.

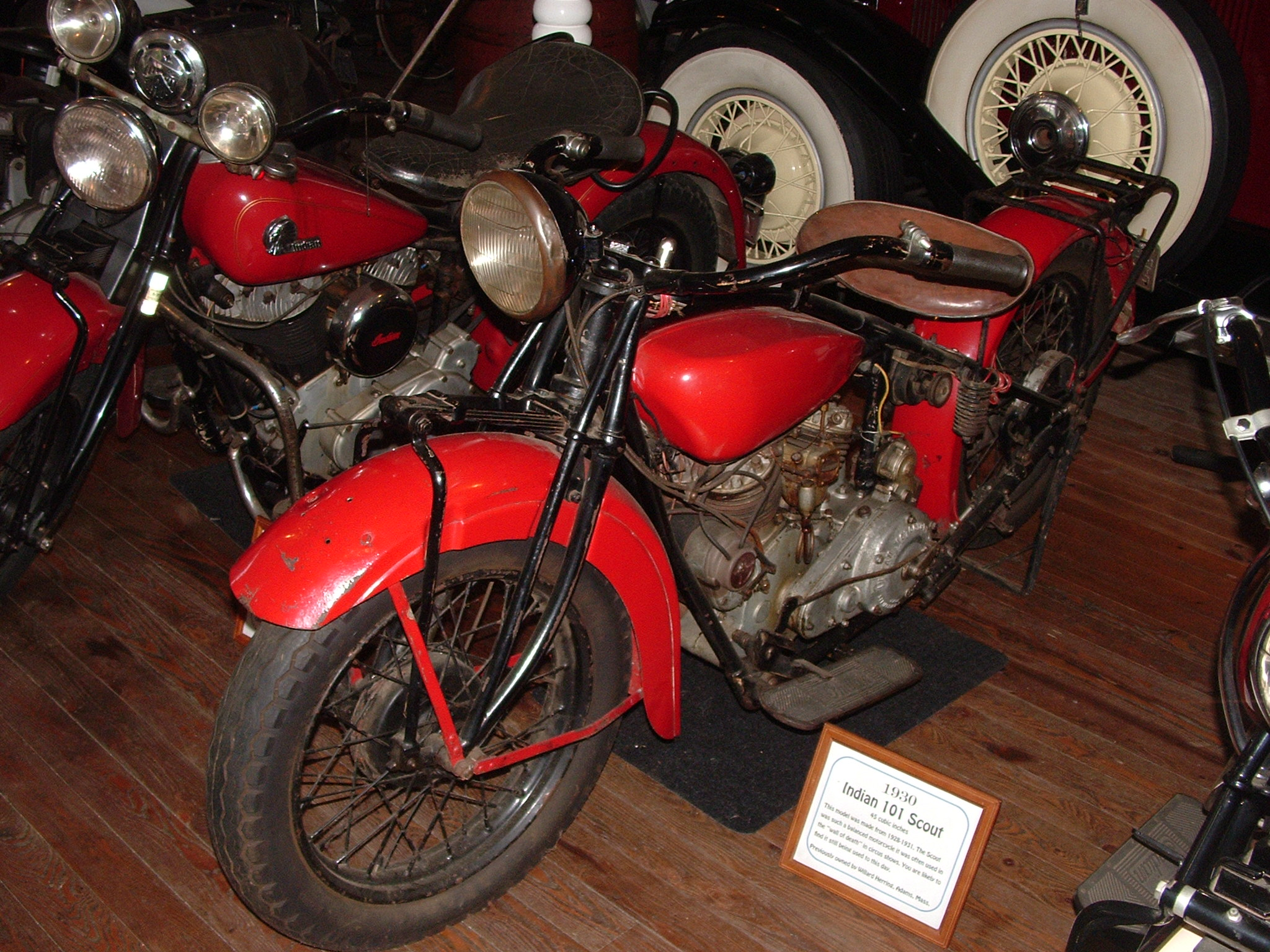
1930 Indian 101 Scout, on display at Clark's Trading Post, Lincoln, New Hampshire

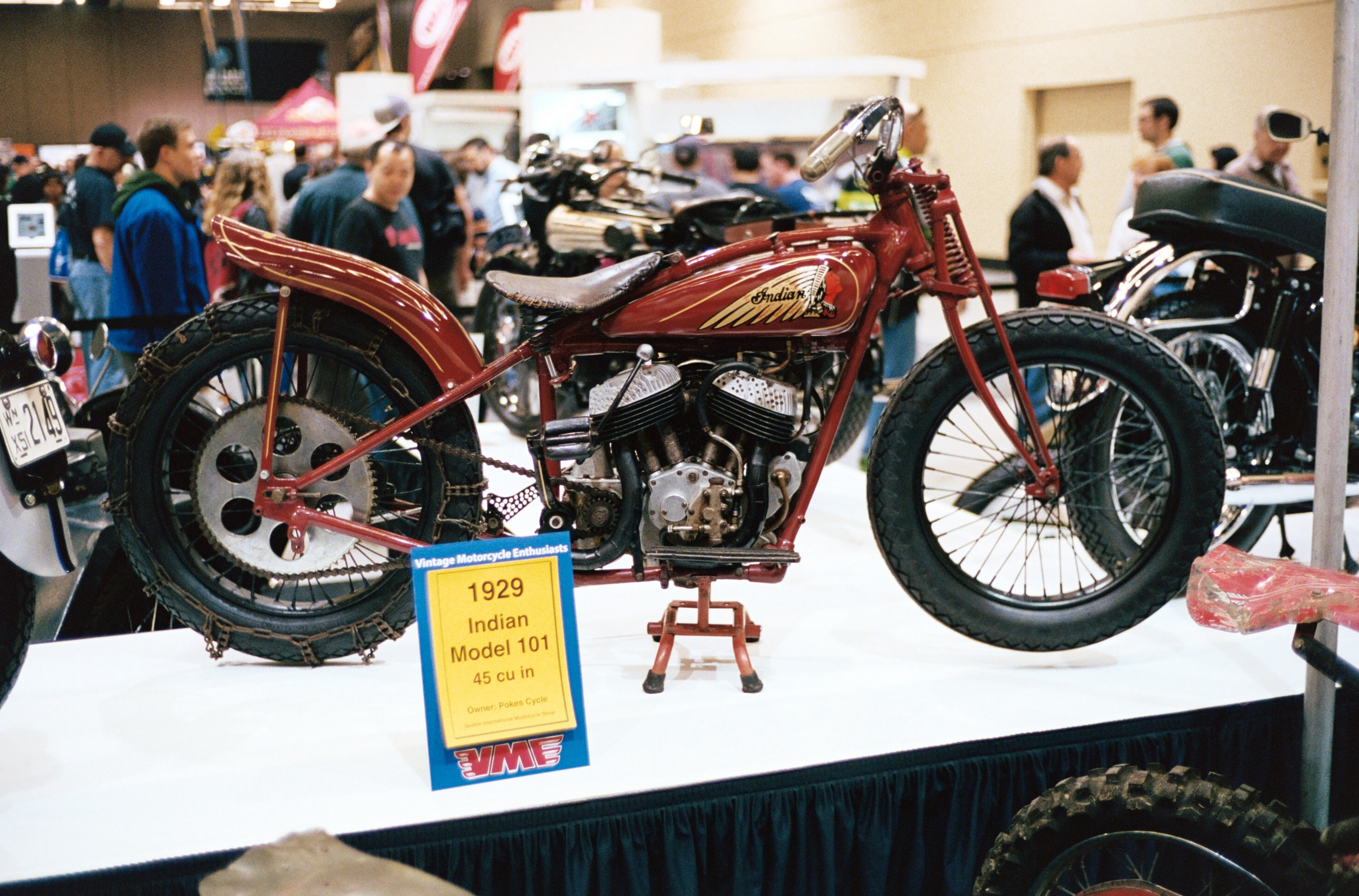
1929 Indian Model 101 modified for hillclimbing

Several 1928-29 Indian 101 Scouts used for a LOUD! wall of death performance in 2017

== Standard Scout (1932-1937) ==
Cost cutting led to Indian designing a new basic frame for 1932 that would form the basis for the Scout, Chief, and Four frames. The 1932 Standard Scout that was based on this new frame was heavier and bulkier than the 101 frame, and was less successful as a result. The Standard Scout remained in production until 1937.

== "Thirty-Fifty" Scout (1932-1941) ==
In 1933, to appease the sporting motorcyclists offended by the replacement of the 101 with the Standard Scout, Indian introduced the Motoplane. This had a Scout engine fitted into the frame of the discontinued Indian Prince single cylinder motorcycle. The Motoplane was also sold as the Pony Scout with the engine displacement reduced to 30.50 cu in (499.8 cc).

The power of the Scout engine was too much for the Prince-derived frame and the Motoplane was discontinued. The less powerful Pony Scout remained in production and was later renamed the Junior Scout. The Pony Scout and the Junior Scout were collectively known as the "Thirty-Fifty" after their engine displacement in cubic inches.

=== 741B ===
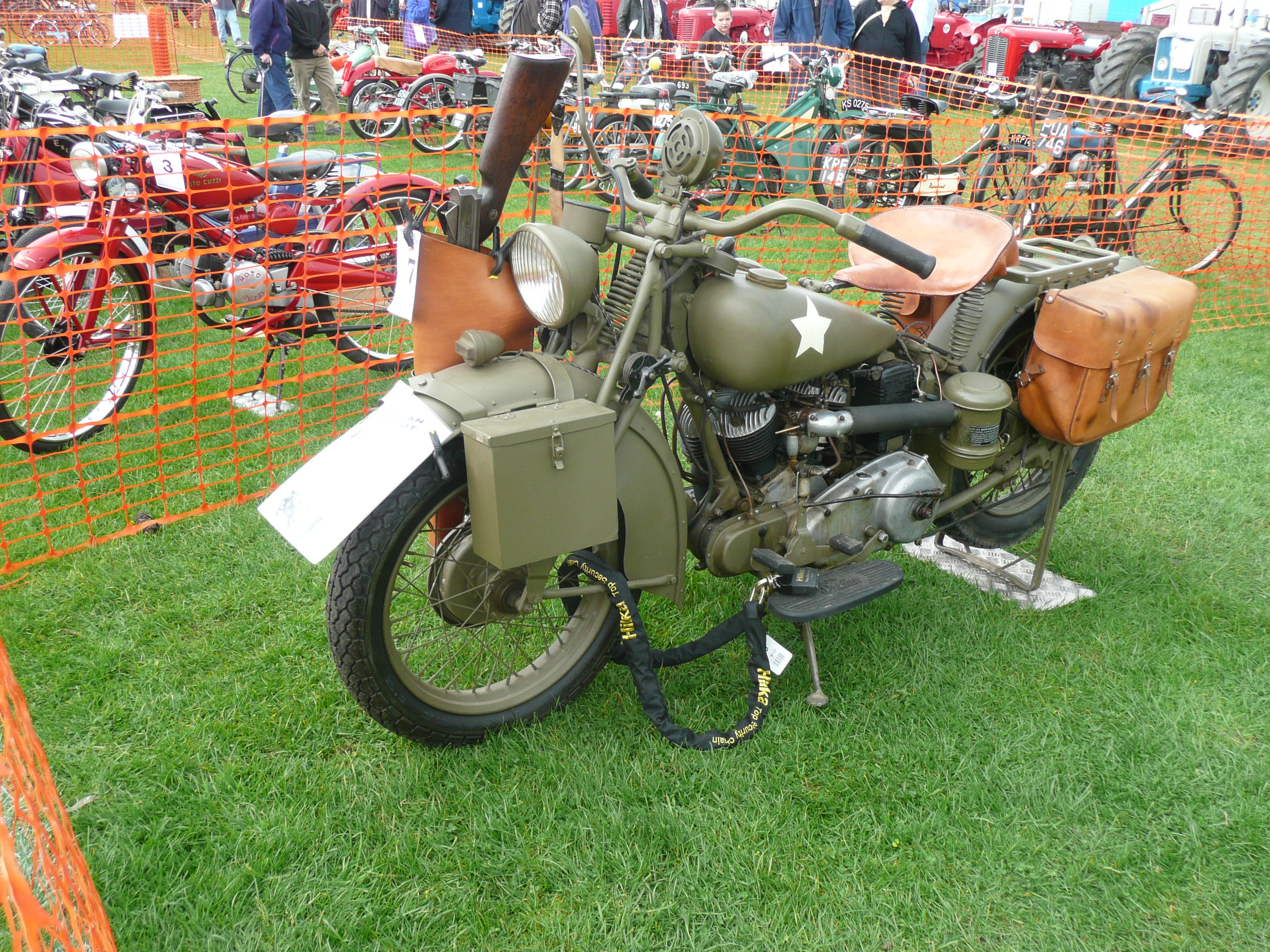
1942 Indian 741

The most common Indian motorcycle made for military use in World War II was the 741B, a military version of the Thirty-Fifty. These were primarily used by British and Commonwealth forces. Around 5000 were sent to USSR under Lend-Lease Program. Indian sold more than 30,000 units of the 741B.

== Sport Scout (1934-1942) ==
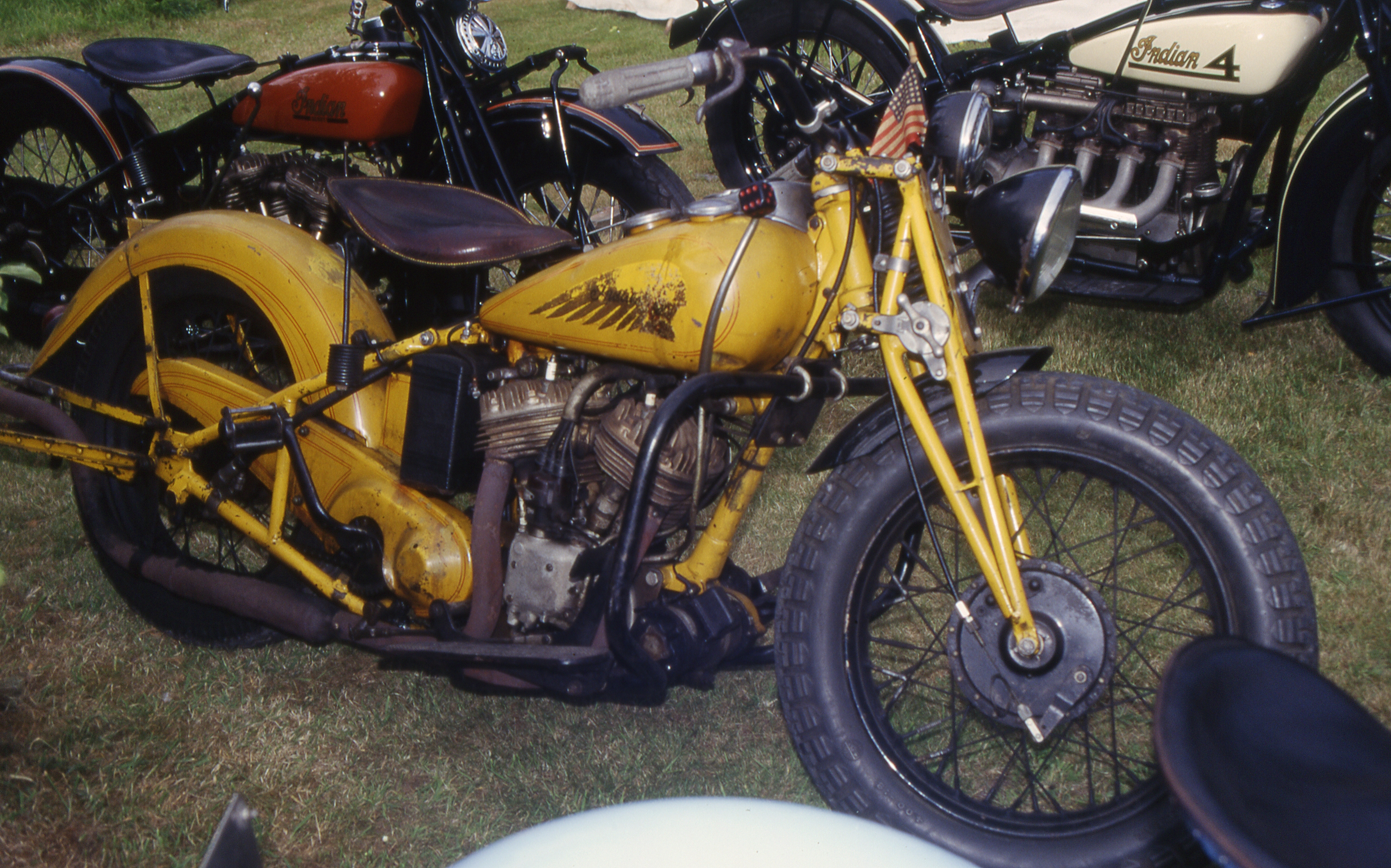
1939 Sport Scout

The negative reaction to the Standard Scout and the failure of the Motoplane led to the creation of the Sport Scout of 1934, with a light frame, girder forks, improved carburation and alloy cylinder heads. The two-piece frame, with the front and rear halves bolted to each other to the top and to the engine at the bottom, was heavier than the Motoplane's Prince-derived frame, but also stronger and stiffer. The Sport Scout was still 15 pounds heavier than the 101 Scout. A specially-tuned Sport Scout won the first Daytona 200 in 1937.

In 1940 the Sport Scout gained full-skirt fenders, a lower seat height and increased fork rake, and in 1941 Indian added plunger-style rear suspension.

=== 640B ===
The 640-B, a military version of the Sport Scout, was tested by the US Army and used on bases within the United States during World War II, but was not shipped overseas. Approximately 2,500 were built.

== Postwar Scouts: 648 and 249 ==
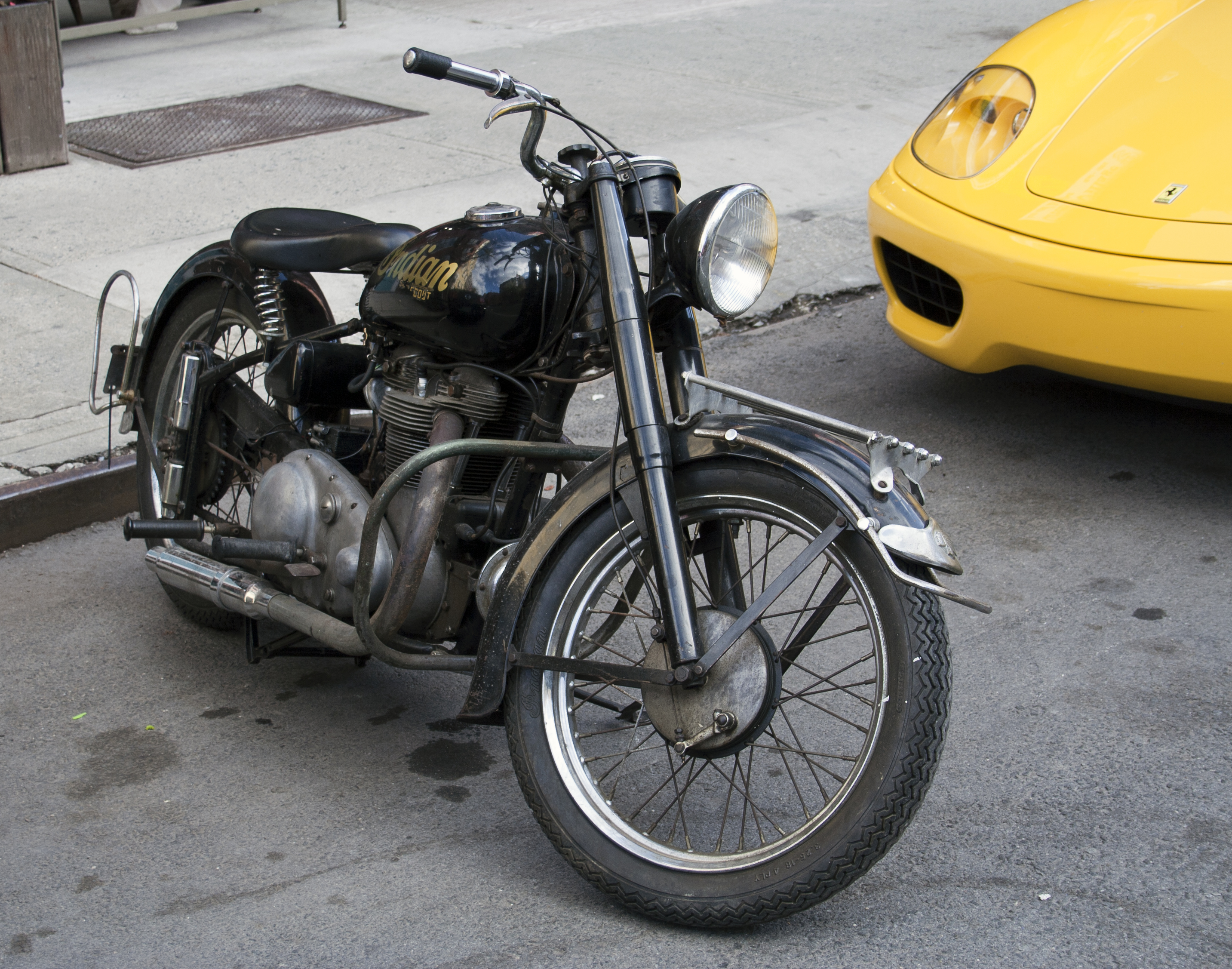
Indian 249 Super Scout

When Indian restarted civilian production in 1946 they produced the Chief only; the Junior Scout, Sport Scout, and Four were discontinued. Engineering work being done on a Model 647 Scout was abandoned in favor of developing a completely new line of lightweight single-cylinder and vertical-twin motorcycles.

In 1948, Indian built 50 units of the 648 Sport Scout. The 648, also called the "Big Base" Scout, was a homologation special built to qualify the type for racing; as such, it was sold primarily to motorcycle racers. Floyd Emde rode a 648 to victory in the 1948 Daytona 200. The 648 was the last traditional Indian Scout.

Introduced in 1949, Indian's line of modular-engined standard motorcycles included the straight-twin 249 Scout. The 249 Scout was replaced by the larger-engined 250 Warrior the next year. The 1949 Scout Model 249 had a 436 cc (26.6 cu in) vertical twin, with a bore and stroke of 2 3/8 in × 3 in (60 mm × 76 mm). To better compete with European 500 cc (31 cu in) class twins, the same engine was enlarged to 500 cc, introduced in 1951 as the Warrior.

== Land speed records ==
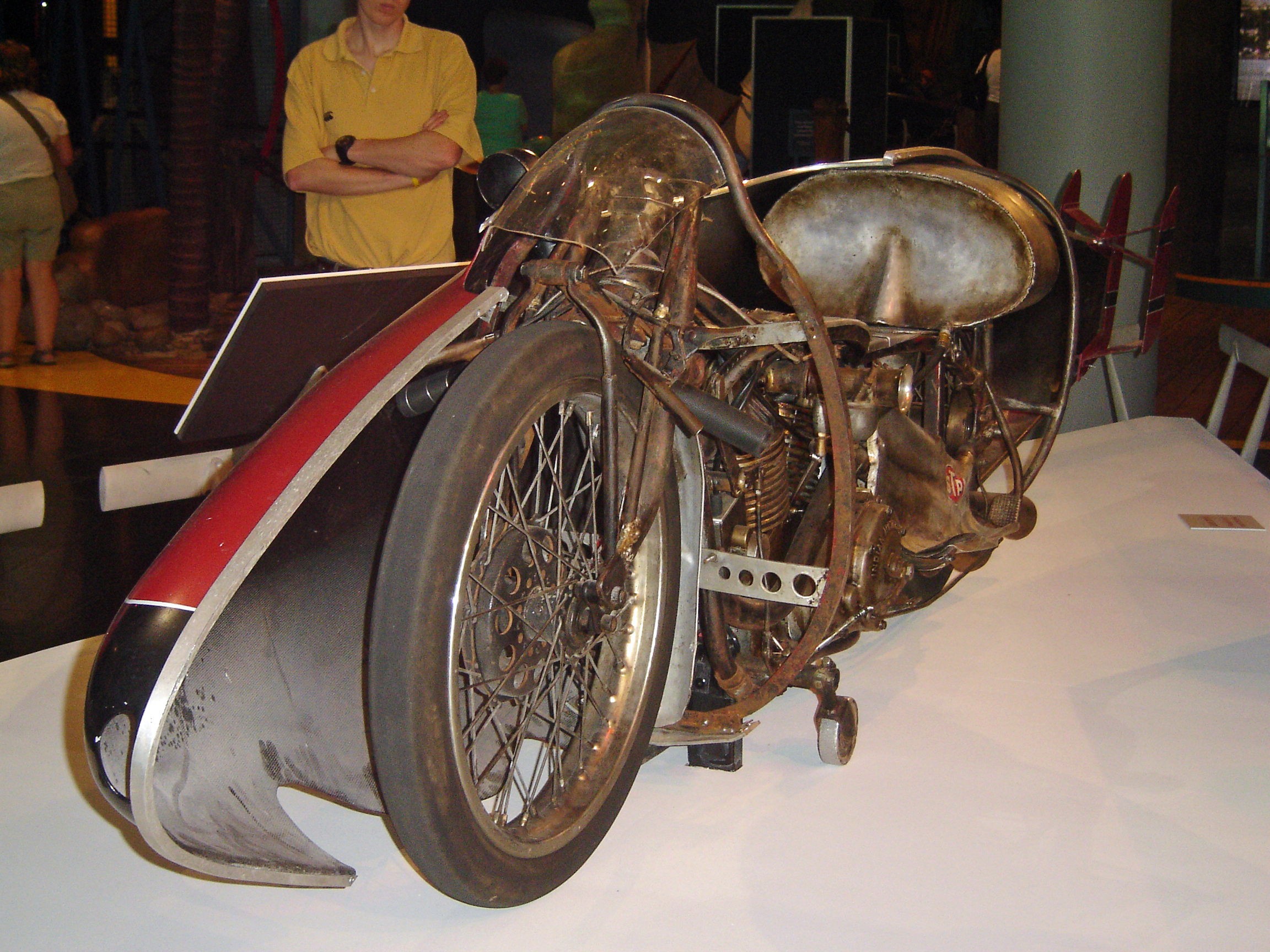
Replica of Burt Munro's 1920 Indian Scout as modified for his record attempts in 1962

Between 1962 and 1967, New Zealander Burt Munro used a modified 1920 Indian Scout to set flying mile land speed records at the Bonneville Salt Flats. His records were:

- 20 August 1962: 54 cu in (880 cc) class record of 178.971 mph (288.026 km/h).
- 22 August 1966: 61 cu in (1,000 cc) class record of 168.066 mph (270.476 km/h).
- 26 August 1967: 61 cu in (1,000 cc) class record of 184.087 mph (296.259 km/h).

Munro's efforts were dramatized in the 2005 film The World's Fastest Indian.

== "Gilroy" Scout ==
2001-2003 Indian Scout
- Manufacturer: Indian Motorcycle Company of America
- Production: 2001-2003
- Assembly: Gilroy, California
- Engine: 87.7 cu in (1,437 cc) 45° S&S V-twin engine
- Bore / stroke: 3.625 in × 4.25 in (92.1 mm × 108.0 mm)
- Ignition type: computer-controlled electronic
- Transmission: 5-speed foot shift
- Suspension: Front: 41 mm telescopic forks Rear:
- Rake, trail: 32°, 5.25 in (133 mm)
- Wheelbase: 67 in (1,700 mm)
- Seat height: 26.5 in (670 mm)
- Related: Indian Chief, Indian Spirit

The Indian Motorcycle Company of America, based in Gilroy, California, built a Scout model from 2001 to 2003. The 2001 Scout had an 88 cubic inch engine and a five-speed transmission; these were assembled at Indian's factory from engine parts made by S&S Cycle and transmission parts made by RevTech. The Scout was available in different versions, including Centennial, Springfield and Deluxe editions.

The Indian Motorcycle Company of America ended production of motorcycles in 2003 and went into liquidation. The Indian brand was revived by the Indian Motorcycle Company, based in Kings Mountain, North Carolina, in 2006, but the Scout name was not used.

== 2015 Scout ==
Indian Scout
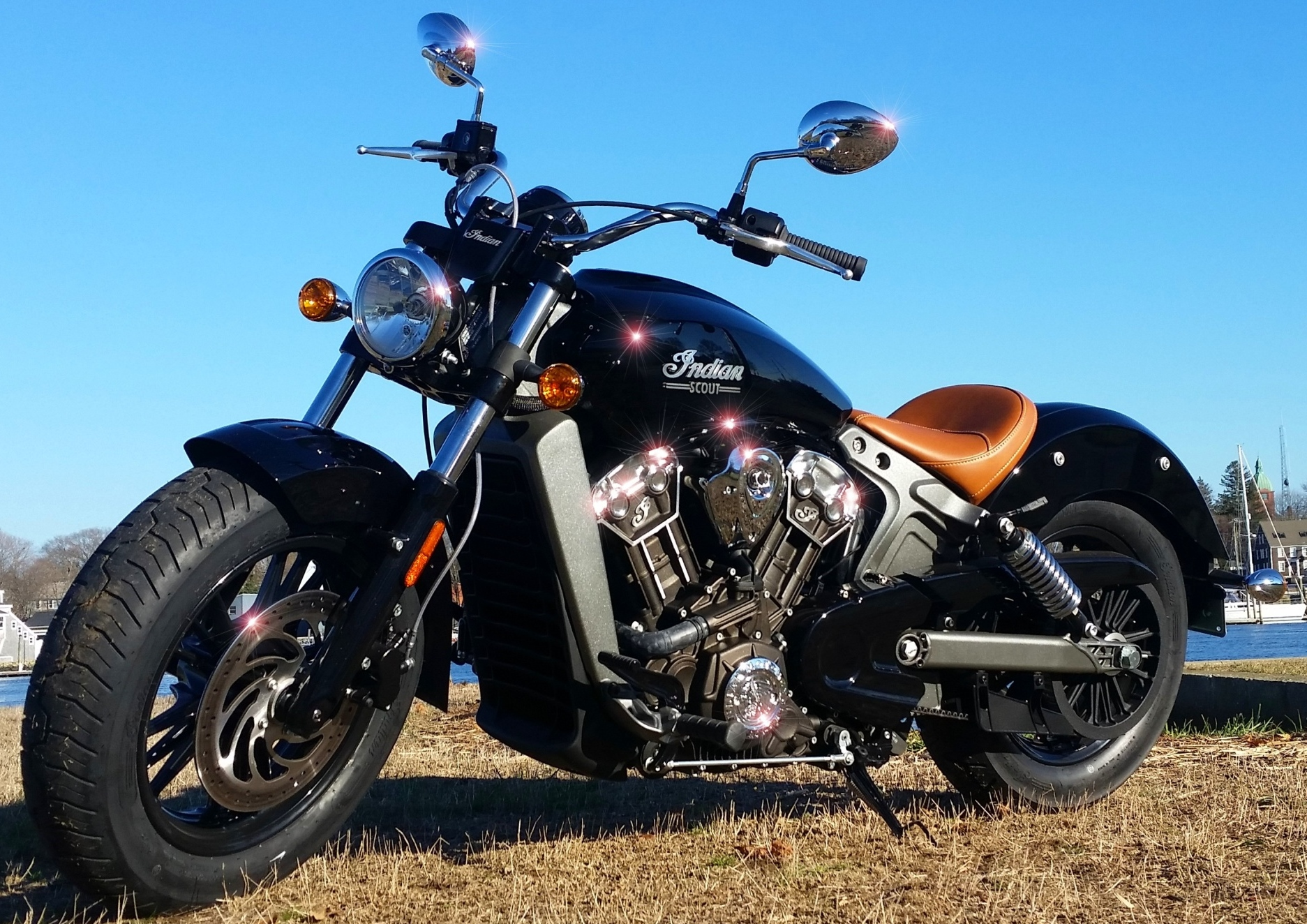
- Manufacturer: Indian Motorcycle International, LLC
- Parent company: Polaris Industries
- Production: Scout: 2015-current Scout Sixty: 2016-current
- Engine: Scout: 69 cu in (1,130 cc) liquid cooled 60° V-twin; Scout Sixty: 60 cu in (980 cc) liquid cooled 60° V-twin
- Bore / stroke: Scout: 99 mm × 73.6 mm (3.90 in × 2.90 in); Scout Sixty: 93 mm × 73.6 mm (3.66 in × 2.90 in)
- Power: Scout: 100 hp (75 kW)(claimed); 86.1 hp (64.2 kW)(rear wheel); Scout Sixty: 78 hp (58 kW)(claimed)
- Torque: Scout:72 lb⋅ft (98 N⋅m) (claimed); 63.8 lb⋅ft (86.5 N⋅m) (rear wheel); Scout Sixty: 65 lb⋅ft (88 N⋅m) (claimed)
- Transmission: Gear drive primary, multi plate wet clutch, belt final drive Scout: 6-speed gearbox Scout Sixty: 5-speed gearbox
- Suspension: Front: Telescopic forks Rear: Dual shocks
- Brakes: Front: Single 11.7 in (298 mm) disc, twin piston caliper Rear: Single 298 mm (11.7 in) disc, single piston caliper
- Tires: Front: 130/90, Rear: 150/80
- Wheelbase: 61.5 in (1,562 mm)
- Dimensions: L: 91.0 in (2,311 mm); W: 35 in (880 mm); H: 47.5 in (1,207 mm)
- Seat height: 25.3 in (643 mm)
- Weight: 528 lb (239 kg)(without fuel)(dry); Scout Sixty:524 lb (238 kg)(without fuel) (dry); 550 lb (250 kg)(wet); Scout Sixty: 546 lb (248 kg) (wet)
- Fuel capacity: 3.3 US gal (12 L; 2.7 imp gal)

In 2011, Polaris Industries bought the Indian Motorcycle Company. For the 2015 model year, under Polaris's ownership, Indian introduced a new Scout model. The 2015 Scout is a cruiser with a 1,133 cc (69.1 cu in) liquid-cooled, V-twin engine and a frame formed by multiple aluminum alloy castings bolted to each other and to the engine. The Scout came with braided brake lines and a belt instead of a chain which reduced maintenance as well as costs.

A lower cost version of the Scout was introduced in 2016 called the Scout Sixty. It is essentially identical to the Scout and uses the same frame, brakes and suspension, but has a smaller 999 cc (61.0 cu in) engine mated to a 5-speed gearbox with a blacked out design.
