= Andy Jones-Wilkins =

American distance runner

Personal information
- Nationality: American
- Born: 1968 (age 57–58)

Sport
- Sport: Athletics
- Event: Ultramarathon

Andy Jones-Wilkins (born 1968) is an American ultramarathon runner, coach, and retired educator. He began running ultramarathons in 1996 and 100-mile ultras in 2000, and became known for frequently finishing among the top 10. This included, in 2005, coming in 2nd overall in the Western States 100 Mile, the Angeles Crest 100 Mile, and the Rocky Raccoon 100 Mile, and a win at Waldo 100k. In 2007, he took first place in both the Vermont 100 Mile and the Grand Teton 100 Mile, also setting a new course record at Teton.

Known by his nickname, "AJW", he has been a member of the Patagonia Ultrarunning Team and is noted as a seven-time consecutive Western States top ten finisher (2004–2011). Mr Jones-Wilkins is also a columnist for the running website iRunFar.com, penning the weekly column, "AJW's Taproom". He also hosts his own ultrarunning podcast interview series "Crack A Brew".

He is married to Shelly Jones-Wilkins, and has three sons. Professionally, he spent 34 years as a high school educator. In 2024, he retired from education and became a running coach with CTS.
