= AJT (motorcycle) =

Arthur Tooze of Adelaide, South Australia built two AJT motorcycles in the early 1920s. The first used a JAP 2.75 hp single-cylinder engine, while the second used a JAP 8 hp V-twin engine. The latter machine was discovered in an unfinished state in the 1970s.
