= AFW (motorcycle) =

German motorcycle manufactured 1923–1925

- Production: 1923–1925
- Class: Motorcycle
- Engine: 246 cc OHV single-cylinder

The AFW was manufactured in Germany between 1923 and 1925, and used a 246 cc overhead valve engine supplied by Hansa Prazisionwerke AG of Bielefeld.
