= Albertus (motorcycle) =

Albertus motorcycles were manufactured in Germany between 1922 and 1924, and featured 113cc, 142cc and 176cc two-stroke engines. While the engines were made at the Königsberg factory, completed bikes were assembled at the Achern factory.
