= AJW Motorcycles =

British motorcycle manufacturer

AJW Motorcycles Ltd
- Type: Private
- Industry: Motorcycle
- Founded: 1928
- Founder: Arthur John Wheaton
- Defunct: 1981
- Fate: Ceased trading
- Headquarters: Exeter, United Kingdom
- Products: Motorcycles

AJW Motorcycles Ltd was a British motorcycle manufacturer, established in Exeter in 1928. The last AJW motorcycle produced was the 125 cc Fox Cub in 1953, after which AJW began importing Italian two-stroke Wolfhound motorcycles with AJW badges. They also produced bikes in the 1970s such as the "Champion", the "Whippet", the "Pointer" and the "Collie". These were all rebadged Italian models. They ceased trading in 1981.

== History ==
Founded by Arthur John Wheaton, (known as Jack) in 1926, using his initials AJW, the company began production in the workshop of the family printing works in Friernhay Street Exeter.

The best-known AJW motorcycles were the Grey Fox and the Red Panther but the company also produced a range of bikes with names including the Silver Fox, Silver Vixen, the Vixen, Flying Vixen, Flying Fox (with a Rudge Ulster engine) and the Speed Fox.

With a torpedo-shaped fuel tank and full duplex tubular loop frame, the engine had twin-port heads and double exhaust pipes down each side. Enthusiast owners included Brooklands racing champions such as Claude Temple and Joe Wright.

Production was limited so they became fairly exclusive, with just 250 motorcycles produced in their best year.
