= Bathurst motorcycle race riots =

Series of disturbances in Australia (1980–1985)

The Bathurst motorcycle race riots, or the Easter Motorcycle riots were a series of disturbances between 1980 and 1985 involving motorsport spectators and the New South Wales Police Force Tactical Response Group during the Australian motorcycle Grand Prix. Every Easter, the population of Bathurst would swell to 70,000, roughly 30,000 of those being motorcycle racing fans, with the police force in turn growing from the 25 normally stationed in the town to more than 500 to watch motorcycle racing in Mount Panorama Circuit, New South Wales. However during the early 80s, the fans and police relations began to breakdown and will eventually start the riots in the area for years.

== Background ==
Motorcycle racing has been a national attraction that were held every Easter in Bathurst since 1931. The event keep attracting large crowds and doubled after the end of World War II. However since 1960s, there are some numerous tensions between the police and spectators attending the early Australian Motorcycle Grand Prix.
