= Matchless Silver Hawk =

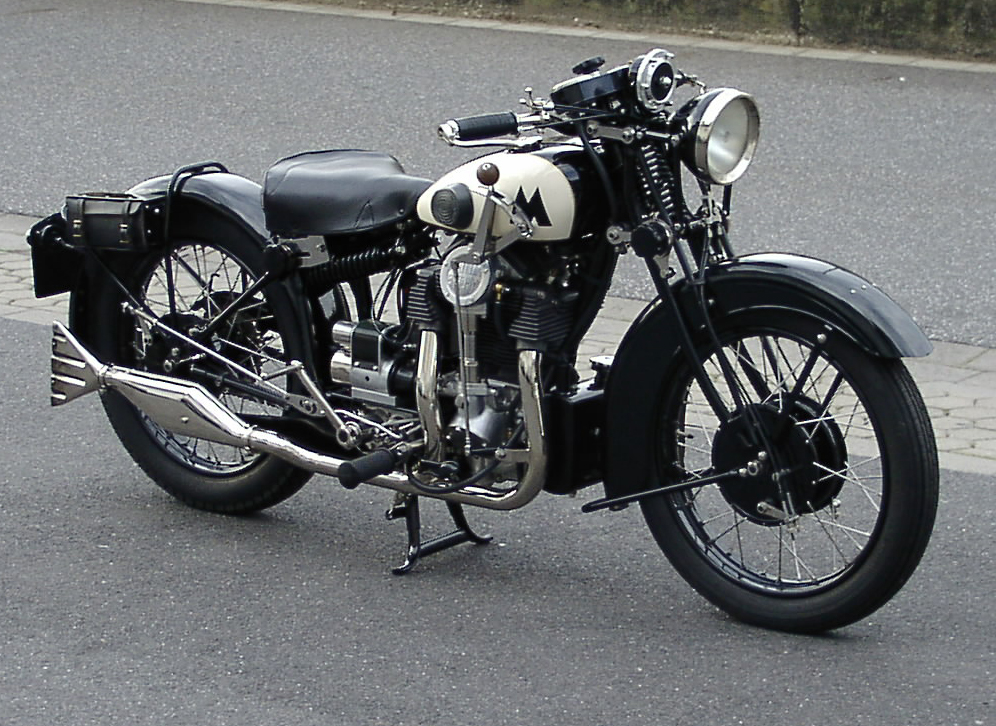
- Manufacturer: Matchless Motor Cycles (Colliers) Ltd, Plumstead Road, London
- Production: 1931-35
- Class: Standard
- Engine: 592 cc (36.1 cu in) OHC 18° V4
- Bore / stroke: 50.8 mm × 73 mm (2.00 in × 2.87 in)
- Top speed: 80–85 mph (129–137 km/h)
- Transmission: Four speed Sturmey Archer Gearbox
- Wheelbase: 56 in (1,400 mm)
- Weight: 380 lb (170 kg) (dry)
- Fuel consumption: 75–80 mpg_{‑imp} (3.8–3.5 L/100 km; 62–67 mpg_{‑US})
- Related: Silver Arrow

Matchless Silver Hawk is a Bert Collier the son of Herbert Collier designed motorcycle produced by Matchless for 1931 and introduced at the 1930 Motorcycle Show at Olympia, London as their range-leading luxury model. It was one of two up-market four-cylinder machines introduced during the 1930 Show season from two manufacturers; the Silver Hawk whose production would last less than four years and the Ariel Square Four, whose production lasted until 1959. Other British manufacturers produced 4-cylinder machines in small quantities in the 1930s, including Brough Superior's Austin-engined BS4 (11 built 1932–34) and the prototype Golden Dream (2 built in 1938).

== Description ==
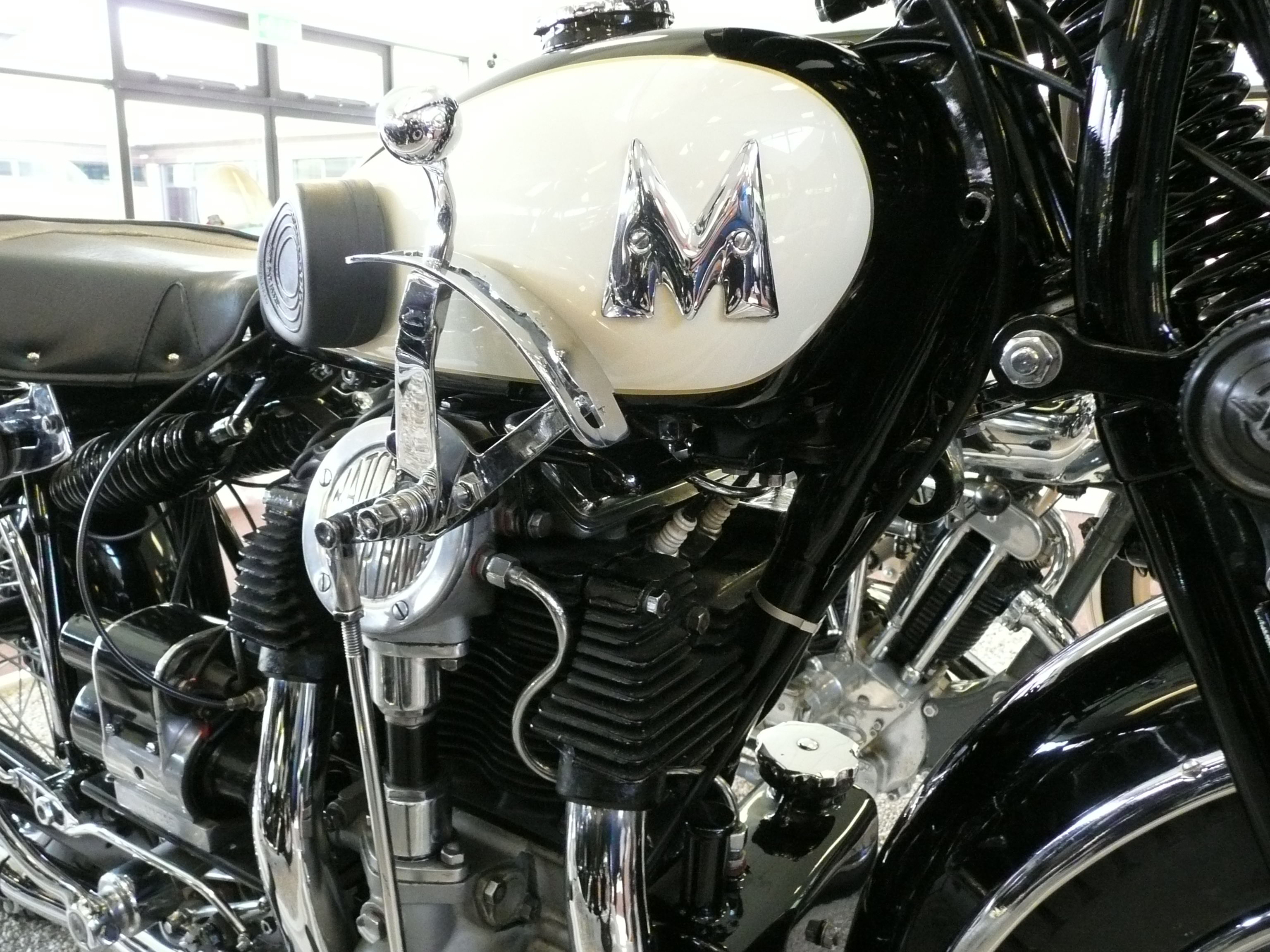
Silver Hawk from 1931 showing close up of hand gear change from the National Motorcycle Museum (UK)

The Silver Hawk's 592 cc design was a development of the Silver Arrow and shared a similar frame design and cycle parts.

Engine	Silver Arrow	Silver Hawk
valve train	SV	OHC
cylinders	twin	4
bore (mm)	54	50,8
stroke (mm)	86	73
engine capacity (ccm)	394	592

The single bevel-gear overhead camshaft ran across the cylinder head and four bores with special air cooling housed two pairs of cylinders at 26 degrees to each other. A single carburettor fed all four induction valves through a cross shaped induction that produced an uneven feed. Lucas coil and dynamo ignition with distributor was driven by skew gearing from the camshaft-drive vertical shaft. A dry-sump oil system was supplied from a 6-pint steel tank at the base of the front-down tube, bolted to the engine's crankcase. The engine was flexible, however, and could be started by hand and run in top gear most of the time. This was an important factor for the hand-operated gear change.

In the sales literature Matchless described the Silver Hawk as unquestionably the most fascinating machine to ride that has ever been built. It combines the silence, smoothness and comfort of the most expensive motor car with a super-sports performance. On top gear alone the machine will run from as low as 6 miles per hour to over 80 miles per hour, while the acceleration given by the four-cylinder overhead camshaft engine in conjunction with the four-speed gearbox must be experienced to be believed.

In a review of a Silver Hawk still in daily use in 1965 it says the bike was only in production for 3 years and was priced at £75. Top speed was said to be over 85 mph, though the handling when the elderly machine was tested was described to be a "bit off, by present day standards". The engine was particularly long-stroke with a bore of 50.8mm and a stroke of 73.2mm. While the front forks were girder-type the rear suspension was triangular with damper and springs under the saddle "same set-up as Vincents".

The main competition for the Matchless Silver Hawk in the top end 4-cylinder British luxury motorcycle market at the time was the Ariel Square Four, which was £5 cheaper, but 100cc smaller (in 1931). Manufacture of the Silver Hawk was expensive and sales were slow - the Hawk was discontinued in 1935.
