= Model 7 =

Model 7 may refer to:

- the Boeing Model 7, a flying boat
- the Remington Model 7, a firearm
- the Norton Model 7 Dominator, a motorcycle
- the Matchless Model 7, a motorcycle
- the Fokker Model 7, an airplane
