= Henry Collier =

Henry Collier may refer to:

- Henry Herbert Collier (1859–1926), founder of the Matchless Motorcycle Company
- Henry W. Collier (1801–1855), Democratic Governor of the U.S. state of Alabama
