= Matchless Silver Arrow =

1929–1933 motorcycle made by Matchless

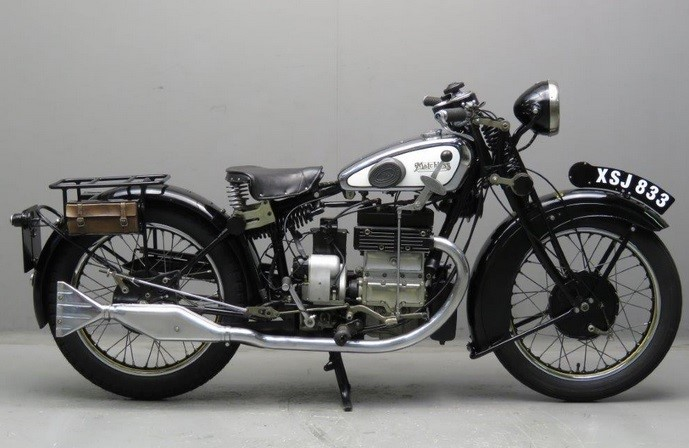
- Manufacturer: Matchless Motor Cycles (Colliers) Ltd, Plumstead Road, London
- Production: 1929-1933
- Engine: 394 cc SV narrow angle (26°) V twin
- Bore / stroke: 54 mm × 86 mm (2.1 in × 3.4 in)
- Power: 16 bhp (12 kW) at 5000 rpm
- Transmission: Sturmey Archer Gearbox; Three speed (1929-1932); Four speed (1932-193x)
- Wheelbase: 56 in (1,400 mm)
- Dimensions: L: 84 in (2,100 mm)
- Seat height: 27.5 in (700 mm)
- Weight: 380 lb (170 kg) (dry)
- Fuel capacity: 2.5 imp gal (11 L; 3.0 US gal)

The Matchless Silver Arrow was a motorcycle made by Matchless from late 1929 to 1933. It had a cast iron head monoblock side-valve, 400 cc, 26° V-twin with chain drive, designed by racer Charlie Collier.

== Description ==
The narrow angle of the cylinder bank's V allowed the use of a one piece head, a practice used by Lancia in its early V4 automobile engines. The rear suspension was a cantilever design using two springs and friction dampers beneath the saddle, very similar to the 1928 Vincent HRD design. Linked brakes were used, as had appeared on the 1925 Rudge Four. The carburettor was an Amal type 4/014 (bottom petrol feed).

== Models ==
Two models were produced, the 'Standard model' which had acetylene lighting and bulb horn, priced in 1930 at £57/10/6 and the 'De Luxe model' which had electric lighting and instrument panel, priced in 1930 at £63/2/6. In 1931 both were designated A/2 and minor changes included a four speed gearbox with improved gear ratios with lower 1st and higher top gear and a more rounded petrol tank, the Amal carburettor jet was changed from 70 to 55 and the diameter of the exhaust pipe was increased with ports on the head spaced further apart (6^{5}/_{8}" instead of 5^{1}/_{8}").

The bike did not sell well and within the year led to the Bert Collier the son of Herbert Collier designed Matchless Silver Hawk.

	Silver Arrow	Silver Hawk
valve train	SV	OHC
cylinders	twin	4
bore (mm)	54	50,8
stroke (mm)	86	73
engine capacity (ccm)	394	592
