= Australian motorcycle Grand Prix =

Motorcycle race held in Australia

Australian Grand Prix

Grand Prix motorcycle racing
- Venue: Adelaide Street Circuit (2027); Phillip Island Grand Prix Circuit (1989–1990, 1997–2019, 2022–2026); Eastern Creek Raceway (1991–1996)
- First race: 1989
- Most wins (rider): Valentino Rossi (8)
- Most wins (manufacturer): Honda (39)

The Australian motorcycle Grand Prix is a motorcycling event that is part of the FIM Grand Prix motorcycle racing season. It has been held at a number of venues, most recently the Phillip Island Grand Prix Circuit near Melbourne, and from 2027 will be held in Adelaide.

== History ==
Eastern Creek Raceway, used from 1991 to 1996

Phillip Island Grand Prix Circuit, used from 1989 to 1990, and from 1997 to 2026

Prior to 1997 the event was held at a number of different venues in Australia, most notably Eastern Creek in Sydney and Mount Panorama in Bathurst, New South Wales. From 1997 until the October 2026 race, it has been run at the Phillip Island Grand Prix Circuit south-east of Melbourne.

The race was cancelled in 2020 and 2021, both due to the COVID-19 pandemic.

== Current ==
The Phillip Island Grand Prix Circuit is contracted to host the event until 2026. After the Victorian Government rejected Dorna Sports' proposal to run MotoGP in Albert Park instead of on Phillip Island, South Australian Premier Peter Malinauskas announced that Adelaide would be hosting the event from 2027 onwards. It is plan to build the track based on the original Adelaide Grand Prix Street Circuit in the city centre and the eastern Park Lands.

== Official names and sponsors ==
- 1989: Swan Premium Australian Motorcycle Grand Prix
- 1990: Drink/Drive Australian Motorcycle Grand Prix
- 1991: Tooheys Australian Motorcycle Grand Prix
- 1992–1994: Foster's Australian Motorcycle Grand Prix
- 1995–1997: Australian Motorcycle Grand Prix (no official sponsor)
- 1998–2001: Qantas Australian Grand Prix
- 2002–2003: SKYY vodka Australian Grand Prix
- 2004: Cinzano Australian Grand Prix
- 2005: Polini Australian Grand Prix
- 2006–2007: GMC Australian Grand Prix
- 2008: Australian Grand Prix (no official sponsor)
- 2009–2011: Iveco Australian Motorcycle Grand Prix
- 2012: AirAsia Australian Motorcycle Grand Prix
- 2013–2014: Tissot Australian Motorcycle Grand Prix
- 2015: Pramac Australian Motorcycle Grand Prix
- 2016–2018: Michelin Australian Motorcycle Grand Prix
- 2019: Pramac Generac Australian Motorcycle Grand Prix
- 2022: Animoca Brands Australian Motorcycle Grand Prix
- 2023: MotoGP Guru by Gryfyn Australian Motorcycle Grand Prix
- 2024: Qatar Airways Australian Motorcycle Grand Prix
- 2025: Liqui Moly Australian Motorcycle Grand Prix
- 2026: Red Bull Grand Prix of Australia

== Winners ==
=== Multiple winners (riders) ===
# Wins	Rider	Wins	
# Wins	Rider	Category	Years won
8	(Italy) Valentino Rossi	MotoGP	2002, 2003, 2004, 2005, 2014
8	(Italy) Valentino Rossi	500cc	2001
8	(Italy) Valentino Rossi	250cc	1998, 1999
6	(Australia) Casey Stoner	MotoGP	2007, 2008, 2009, 2010, 2011, 2012
5	(Spain) Marc Márquez	MotoGP	2015, 2017, 2019, 2024
5	(Spain) Marc Márquez	125cc	2010
3	(Italy) Loris Capirossi	500cc	1996
3	(Italy) Loris Capirossi	125cc	1990, 1991
3	(Germany) Ralf Waldmann	250cc	1995, 1997
3	(Germany) Ralf Waldmann	125cc	1992
3	(Australia) Mick Doohan	500cc	1992, 1995, 1998
3	(Italy) Max Biaggi	500cc	2000
3	(Italy) Max Biaggi	250cc	1994, 1996
3	(Italy) Marco Melandri	MotoGP	2006
3	(Italy) Marco Melandri	250cc	2002
3	(Italy) Marco Melandri	125cc	1999
3	(Spain) Jorge Lorenzo	MotoGP	2013
3	(Spain) Jorge Lorenzo	250cc	2006, 2007
3	(South Africa) Brad Binder	Moto2	2018, 2019
3	(South Africa) Brad Binder	Moto3	2016
3	(Spain) Álex Rins	MotoGP	2022
3	(Spain) Álex Rins	Moto2	2015
3	(Spain) Álex Rins	Moto3	2013
2	(Australia) Wayne Gardner	500cc	1989, 1990
2	(Italy) Luca Cadalora	250cc	1991, 1992
2	(United States) John Kocinski	500cc	1994
2	(United States) John Kocinski	250cc	1990
2	(Spain) Àlex Crivillé	500cc	1997
2	(Spain) Àlex Crivillé	125cc	1989
2	(Japan) Masao Azuma	125cc	1998, 2000
2	(Italy) Marco Simoncelli	250cc	2008, 2009
2	(San Marino) Alex de Angelis	Moto2	2010, 2011
2	(Germany) Sandro Cortese	Moto3	2012
2	(Germany) Sandro Cortese	125cc	2011
2	(Spain) Pol Espargaró	Moto2	2012, 2013
2	(Switzerland) Thomas Lüthi	Moto2	2016
2	(Switzerland) Thomas Lüthi	125cc	2005
2	(Portugal) Miguel Oliveira	Moto2	2017
2	(Portugal) Miguel Oliveira	Moto3	2015
2	(Spain) Maverick Viñales	MotoGP	2018
2	(Spain) Maverick Viñales	Moto2	2014

=== Multiple winners (manufacturers) ===
# Wins	Manufacturer	Wins	
# Wins	Manufacturer	Category	Years won
39	(Japan) Honda	MotoGP	2002, 2003, 2006, 2011, 2012, 2015, 2016, 2017, 2019
39	(Japan) Honda	500cc	1989, 1990, 1992, 1995, 1997, 1998, 1999, 2001
39	(Japan) Honda	250cc	1989, 1991, 1992, 1995, 1997, 2001, 2003, 2005
39	(Japan) Honda	Moto3	2017, 2019
39	(Japan) Honda	125cc	1990, 1991, 1992, 1993, 1995, 1997, 1998, 1999, 2000, 2003, 2004, 2005
14	(Italy) Aprilia	MotoGP	2025
14	(Italy) Aprilia	250cc	1994, 1996, 1998, 1999, 2002, 2004, 2006, 2007
14	(Italy) Aprilia	125cc	1996, 1994, 2006, 2009, 2011
11	(Japan) Yamaha	MotoGP	2004, 2005, 2013, 2014, 2018
11	(Japan) Yamaha	500cc	1991, 1996, 2000
11	(Japan) Yamaha	250cc	1990, 1993, 2000
11	(Austria) KTM	Moto2	2017, 2018, 2019
11	(Austria) KTM	Moto3	2012, 2013, 2014, 2015, 2016, 2018, 2023, 2025
7	(Germany) Kalex	Moto2	2012, 2013, 2014, 2015, 2016, 2023, 2025
6	(Italy) Ducati	MotoGP	2007, 2008, 2009, 2010, 2023, 2024
4	(Spain) Derbi	125cc	2001, 2007, 2008, 2010
3	(Italy) Gilera	250cc	2008, 2009
3	(Italy) Gilera	125cc	2002
2	(Italy) Motobi	Moto2	2010, 2011
2	(Japan) Suzuki	MotoGP	2022
2	(Japan) Suzuki	500cc	1993
2	(Italy) Boscoscuro	Moto2	2022, 2024

=== By year ===
Year	Track	Moto3		Moto2		MotoGP		Report
Year	Track	Rider	Manufacturer	Rider	Manufacturer	Rider	Manufacturer	Report
2026	Phillip Island	Cancelled due to inclement weather and poor visibility						Report
2025	Phillip Island	(Spain) José Antonio Rueda	KTM	(Australia) Senna Agius	Kalex	(Spain) Raúl Fernández	Aprilia	Report
2024	Phillip Island	(Colombia) David Alonso	CFMoto	(Spain) Fermín Aldeguer	Boscoscuro	(Spain) Marc Márquez	Ducati	Report
2023	Phillip Island	(Turkey) Deniz Öncü	KTM	(Italy) Tony Arbolino	Kalex	(France) Johann Zarco	Ducati	Report
2022	Phillip Island	(Spain) Izan Guevara	GasGas	(Spain) Alonso López	Boscoscuro	(Spain) Álex Rins	Suzuki	Report
2021	Phillip Island	Cancelled due to the COVID-19 pandemic						
2020	Phillip Island	Cancelled due to the COVID-19 pandemic						
2019	Phillip Island	(Italy) Lorenzo Dalla Porta	Honda	(South Africa) Brad Binder	KTM	(Spain) Marc Márquez	Honda	Report
2018	Phillip Island	(Spain) Albert Arenas	KTM	(South Africa) Brad Binder	KTM	(Spain) Maverick Viñales	Yamaha	Report
2017	Phillip Island	(Spain) Joan Mir	Honda	(Portugal) Miguel Oliveira	KTM	(Spain) Marc Márquez	Honda	Report
2016	Phillip Island	(South Africa) Brad Binder	KTM	(Switzerland) Thomas Lüthi	Kalex	(United Kingdom) Cal Crutchlow	Honda	Report
2015	Phillip Island	(Portugal) Miguel Oliveira	KTM	(Spain) Álex Rins	Kalex	(Spain) Marc Márquez	Honda	Report
2014	Phillip Island	(Australia) Jack Miller	KTM	(Spain) Maverick Viñales	Kalex	(Italy) Valentino Rossi	Yamaha	Report
2013	Phillip Island	(Spain) Álex Rins	KTM	(Spain) Pol Espargaró	Kalex	(Spain) Jorge Lorenzo	Yamaha	Report
2012	Phillip Island	(Germany) Sandro Cortese	KTM	(Spain) Pol Espargaró	Kalex	(Australia) Casey Stoner	Honda	Report
Year	Track	125cc		Moto2		MotoGP		Report
Year	Track	Rider	Manufacturer	Rider	Manufacturer	Rider	Manufacturer	Report
2011	Phillip Island	(Germany) Sandro Cortese	Aprilia	(San Marino) Alex de Angelis	Motobi	(Australia) Casey Stoner	Honda	Report
2010	Phillip Island	(Spain) Marc Márquez	Derbi	(San Marino) Alex de Angelis	Motobi	(Australia) Casey Stoner	Ducati	Report
Year	Track	125cc		250cc		MotoGP		Report
Year	Track	Rider	Manufacturer	Rider	Manufacturer	Rider	Manufacturer	Report
2009	Phillip Island	(Spain) Julián Simón	Aprilia	(Italy) Marco Simoncelli	Gilera	(Australia) Casey Stoner	Ducati	Report
2008	Phillip Island	(France) Mike di Meglio	Derbi	(Italy) Marco Simoncelli	Gilera	(Australia) Casey Stoner	Ducati	Report
2007	Phillip Island	(Czech Republic) Lukáš Pešek	Derbi	(Spain) Jorge Lorenzo	Aprilia	(Australia) Casey Stoner	Ducati	Report
2006	Phillip Island	(Spain) Álvaro Bautista	Aprilia	(Spain) Jorge Lorenzo	Aprilia	(Italy) Marco Melandri	Honda	Report
2005	Phillip Island	(Switzerland) Thomas Lüthi	Honda	(Spain) Daniel Pedrosa	Honda	(Italy) Valentino Rossi	Yamaha	Report
2004	Phillip Island	(Italy) Andrea Dovizioso	Honda	(Argentina) Sebastián Porto	Aprilia	(Italy) Valentino Rossi	Yamaha	Report
2003	Phillip Island	(Italy) Andrea Ballerini	Honda	(Italy) Roberto Rolfo	Honda	(Italy) Valentino Rossi	Honda	Report
2002	Phillip Island	(San Marino) Manuel Poggiali	Gilera	(Italy) Marco Melandri	Aprilia	(Italy) Valentino Rossi	Honda	Report
Year	Track	125cc		250cc		500cc		Report
Year	Track	Rider	Manufacturer	Rider	Manufacturer	Rider	Manufacturer	Report
2001	Phillip Island	(Japan) Youichi Ui	Derbi	(Japan) Daijiro Kato	Honda	(Italy) Valentino Rossi	Honda	Report
2000	Phillip Island	(Japan) Masao Azuma	Honda	(France) Olivier Jacque	Yamaha	(Italy) Max Biaggi	Yamaha	Report
1999	Phillip Island	(Italy) Marco Melandri	Honda	(Italy) Valentino Rossi	Aprilia	(Japan) Tadayuki Okada	Honda	Report
1998	Phillip Island	(Japan) Masao Azuma	Honda	(Italy) Valentino Rossi	Aprilia	(Australia) Mick Doohan	Honda	Report
1997	Phillip Island	(Japan) Noboru Ueda	Honda	(Germany) Ralf Waldmann	Honda	(Spain) Àlex Crivillé	Honda	Report
1996	Eastern Creek	(Australia) Garry McCoy	Aprilia	(Italy) Max Biaggi	Aprilia	(Italy) Loris Capirossi	Yamaha	Report
1995	Eastern Creek	(Japan) Haruchika Aoki	Honda	(Germany) Ralf Waldmann	Honda	(Australia) Mick Doohan	Honda	Report
1994	Eastern Creek	(Japan) Kazuto Sakata	Aprilia	(Italy) Max Biaggi	Aprilia	(United States) John Kocinski	Cagiva	Report
1993	Eastern Creek	(Germany) Dirk Raudies	Honda	(Japan) Tetsuya Harada	Yamaha	(United States) Kevin Schwantz	Suzuki	Report
1992	Eastern Creek	(Germany) Ralf Waldmann	Honda	(Italy) Luca Cadalora	Honda	(Australia) Mick Doohan	Honda	Report
1991	Eastern Creek	(Italy) Loris Capirossi	Honda	(Italy) Luca Cadalora	Honda	(United States) Wayne Rainey	Yamaha	Report
1990	Phillip Island	(Italy) Loris Capirossi	Honda	(United States) John Kocinski	Yamaha	(Australia) Wayne Gardner	Honda	Report
1989	Phillip Island	(Spain) Àlex Crivillé	JJ Cobas	(Spain) Sito Pons	Honda	(Australia) Wayne Gardner	Honda	Report

Year	Track	Rider	Bike
1988	Bathurst	Mick Doohan	Yamaha FZR750
1987	Winton	Kevin Magee	Yamaha FZR750
1986	Bathurst	Malcolm Campbell	Honda NR750
1983	Bathurst	Andrew Johnson	Honda RS500
1978	Bathurst	Hideo Kanaya	Yamaha 750
1976	Sandown	Warren Willing	Yamaha 750
1968	Bathurst	Ron Toombs	Henderson Matchless G50
1967	Bathurst	Ron Toombs	Henderson Matchless G50
1966	Bathurst	Ron Toombs	Henderson Matchless G50
1957	Bandiana	Jack Forrest	BMW
1952	Bathurst	Harry Hinton	
1946	Bathurst	Ron Kessing	Velocette 495
1940	Bathurst	Bat Byrnes	Norton
1937	Vale	Stuart Williams	Velocette 495
1933	Vale	George Hannaford	Rudge
1924	Goulburn	Dave Brewster	Indian Chief
1915	Yetholme	James Mellor	Matchless
1914	Yetholme	Edgar Meller	2 3/4 TT Douglas

== Riots at Bathurst ==
The Bathurst motorcycle race riots, or Easter Motorcycle riots were a series of disturbances between 1980 and 1985 involving motorsport spectators and the New South Wales Police Force Tactical Response Group during the Australian motorcycle Grand Prix.

Following the 1985 race meeting, the Bathurst Regional Council placed a total ban on spectators taking their own alcohol into events at the Mount Panorama Circuit. This ban has subsequently been revoked. The council also put a limit on the number of drinks spectators could purchase per day from the outlets at the track. This also had a flow on effect for the circuits other annual event, the Bathurst 1000 touring car race held on the October long weekend, though traditionally the Bathurst 1000 crowd was much better behaved.

== See also ==
- Motorsport in Australia
- List of Australian motor racing series
