= Vale Circuit =

Former motor racing circuit

- Location: Bathurst, New South Wales, Australia
- Coordinates: 33°26′31.86″S 149°34′43.39″E
- Opened: 4 April 1931; 94 years ago
- Closed: 27 March 1937; 88 years ago
- Major events: NSW Grand Prix (1931); Australian motorcycle Grand Prix (1933, 1937); Australian Tourist Trophy (1934, 1936)

Clockwise (1934–1937)
- Length: 11.635 km (7.228 miles)
- Race lap record: 6:11 ( (Australia) Art Senior, AJS, 1937, Senior TT)

Anticlockwise (1931–1933)
- Length: 11.5 km (7.11 miles)

The Vale Circuit was a temporary motor racing circuit located on the outskirts of Bathurst, New South Wales, Australia. Predominantly used for motorcycle racing, it is considered the precursor to the Mount Panorama Circuit despite not being located on the same site.

== History ==
The circuit was the fourth iteration of a temporary motorcycle racing venue in the Central Tablelands, with the previous 100km-long "Sunny Corner" loop based in Lithgow (used between 1926 and 1930) derided by police for being unmanageable. The 11.5km anticlockwise layout was based on the main thoroughfare from Bathurst to Goulburn, and followed a series of narrow, corrugated gravel tracks across Mount Tamar including two timber bridges over Vale Creek – the only section of bitumen was a 100m strip used by the Bathurst Sale Yards that was turned into a makeshift pit/paddock area.

The first event, held on Easter weekend in 1931, was the NSW Grand Prix. Abercrombie Shire Council refused to completely shut the main road that traversed the circuit, and roped off one lane to allow local traffic to flow aided by a motorcycle-mounted marshal – in later years, an earth bank was used to demarcate the section used for racing. 40 riders contested their choice of three races; Don Bain winning the Junior GP on a Velocette, Gus Clifton the Senior GP on a Rudge, and Wally James the Unlimited TT handicap race on a Scott. Interstate riders from Victoria and Queensland made their mark on the subsequent two events, with Victorians Jimmie Pringle and George Hannaford winning the Senior titles in 1932 and 1933 respectively – the latter awarded the title of Australian Grand Prix.

With the event christened the Australian TT for 1934, races switched to running the circuit in a clockwise direction as riders were being blinded by a combination of the setting sun and the heavy dust kicked up by competitors running the opposite direction. The circuit's upgraded status led to an influx of interstate riders and the addition of a 250cc class to the Junior GP – Art Senior claimed his first Vale victory in the Junior, and interstate riders Curley Anderson and Pringle finishing 1–2 in the Senior.

Heavy rain resulted in the 1935 event run in muddy conditions. Circuit safety was improved with the installation of a PA system and a field telephone for marshals to communicate, however local opposition to the race from residents and police was growing. A concerted push from local businesses eager keep trading in the aftermath of the Great Depression and the reinstatement of the Australian TT title kept the event going for another year, however a combination of increasing speeds, further deterioration of the racing surface, the ever-present threat of dust, the divided main road and the construction of the Mount Panorama Circuit led to authorities proclaiming that the 1937 event would be the last. Bain, a four-time winner of the Junior TT, took the final Senior title as Art Senior claimed the track record.
