= Matchless Model 7 =

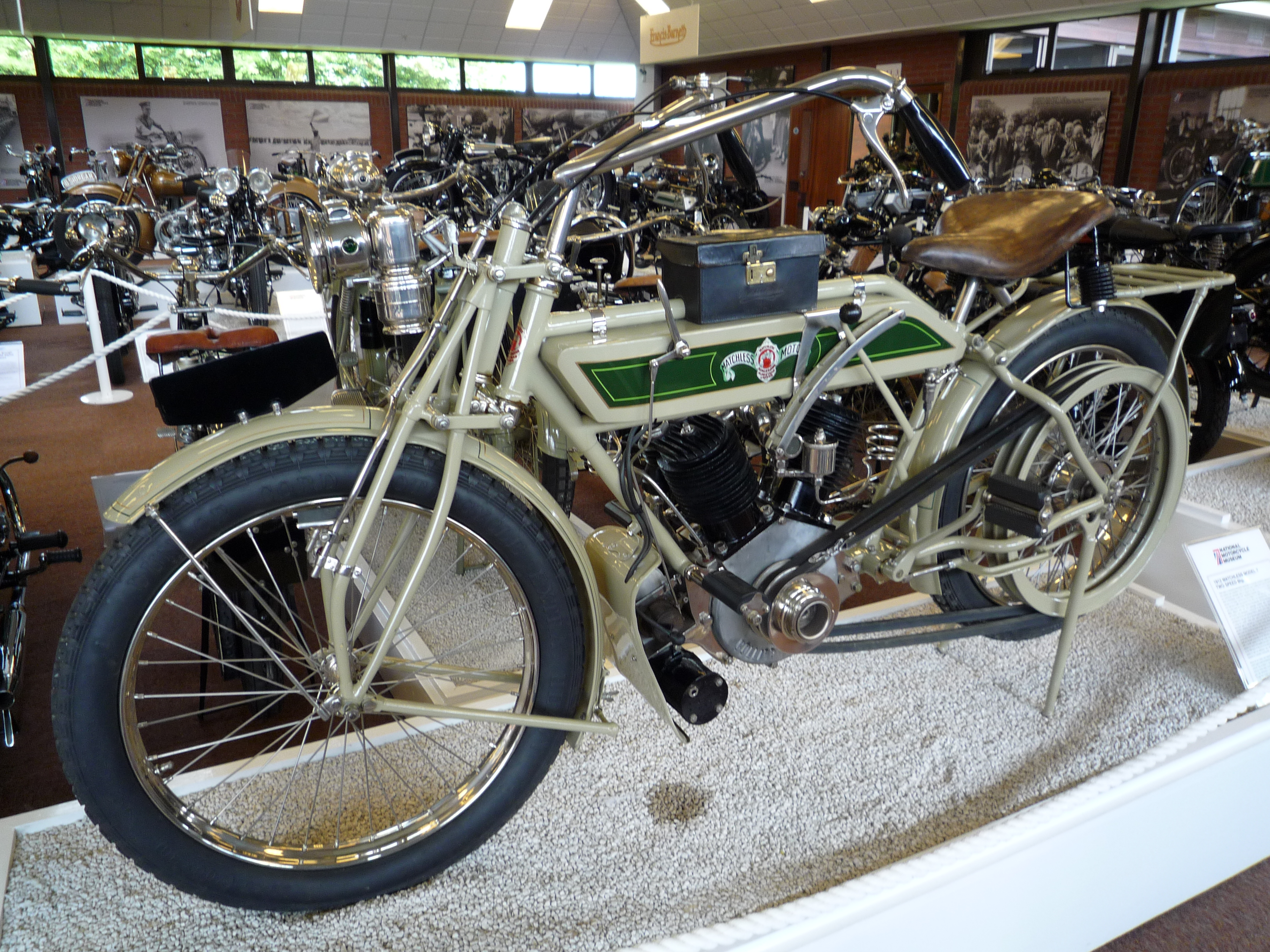
- Manufacturer: Matchless Plumstead London
- Also called: Two Speed 8hp
- Production: 1912
- Engine: 770cc JAP V-twin side valve four stroke
- Transmission: direct belt drive with three speed hub gear
- Weight: 0 pounds (0 kg) (dry)

The Matchless Model 7 is a British 'touring' motorcycle designed and made by Harry and Charlie Collier. Based on the proven 85mm x 85mm JAP V-twin engine, the Model 7 had a two-speed transmission with a hub gear and an epicyclic gear for the low ratio, with a friction band clutch operated by a hand lever at the side of the fuel tank. Problems with unreliable belt drive were addressed by having two belts side by side, so when the first broke, the second would still work. The 770cc engine was started like a moped with pedals, and a small lever on the end of the silencer could be used to eject smoke and sparks. The paintwork was all done by hand in page grey with a forest-green panelled tank lined in gold pinstriping.

Matchless also produced a three-speed model that had a variable pulley and a moveable rear wheel, similar to the Zenith Gradua. Production was limited however, and after 1912 they concentrated on making their own engines until the First World War stopped production.

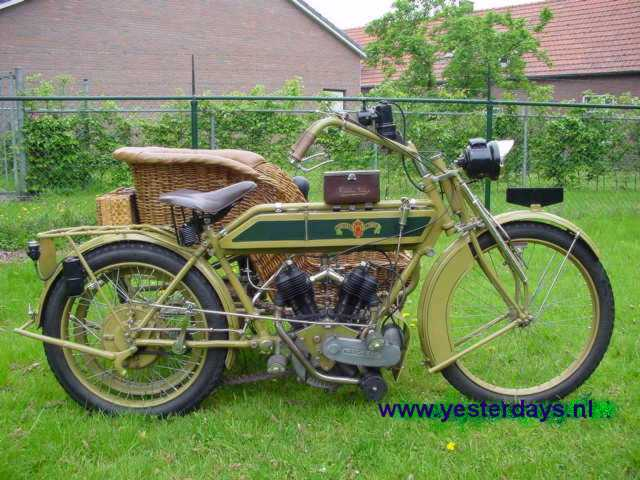
Matchless 2-speed 1000cc 1913
