= Matchless =

British motorcycle and automobile manufacturer

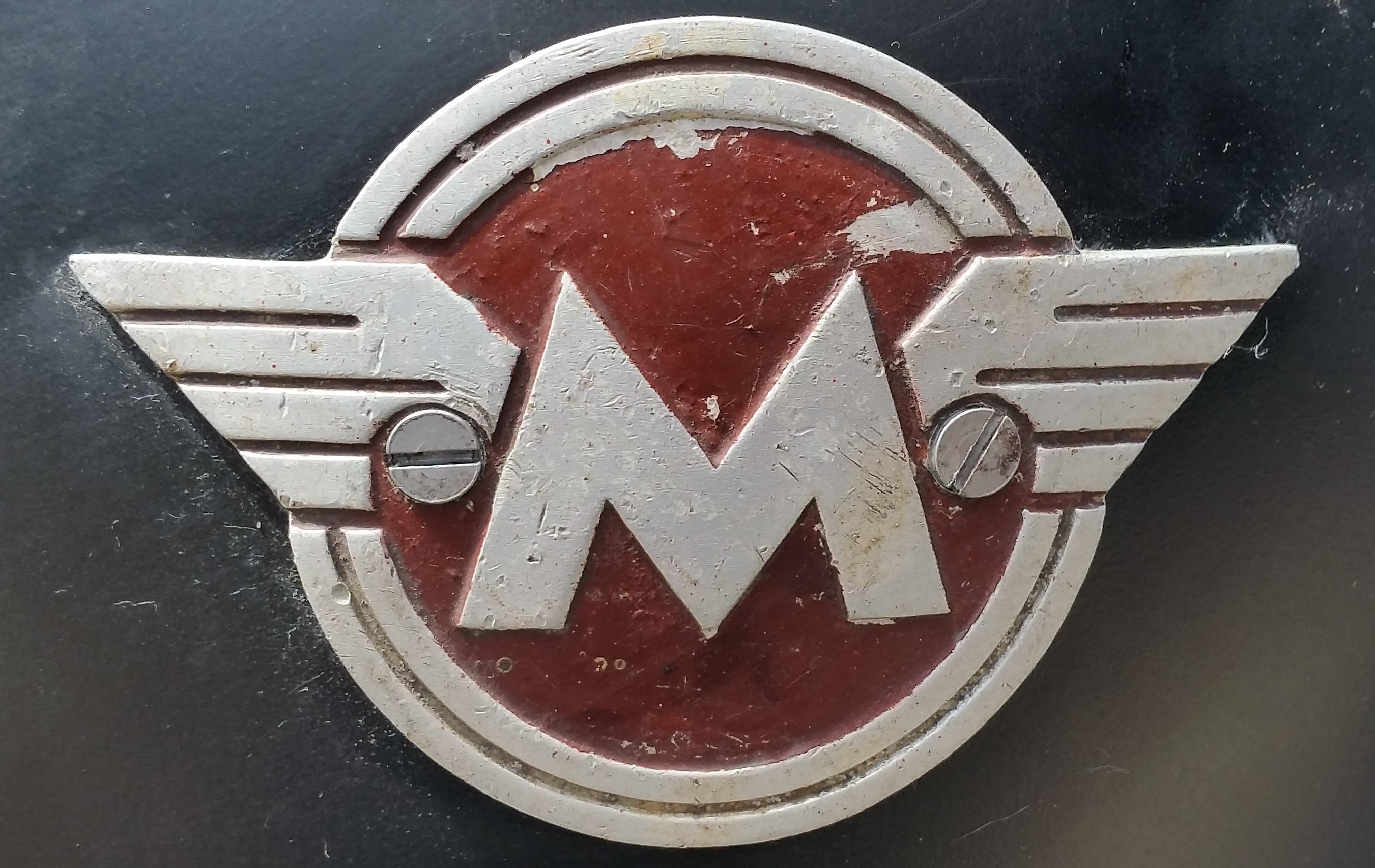
- Matchless Tank Badge (1959)
- Industry: Motorcycle
- Founded: 1899
- Founder: Henry Herbert Collier
- Defunct: 1966
- Headquarters: Plumstead, London, UK
- Key people: Henry Herbert Collier and his sons Charlie and Harry

Matchless is a former British motorcycle manufacturer, in operation between 1899 and 1966. A wide range of models were produced in Plumstead, London, ranging from small two-strokes to 750 cc four-stroke twins. One of the nation's oldest marques, Matchless had a long history of racing success. A Matchless ridden by Charlie Collier won the single-cylinder race in the first Isle of Man TT, held in 1907.

In 1938, Matchless and AJS became part of Associated Motorcycles (AMC), but continued producing models under their own marques. During the amalgamations that occurred in the British motorcycle industry in the 1960s, the four-stroke Matchless twin was replaced with the Norton twin, ending a long history of independent production. By 1967, the Matchless singles had ceased production.

== History ==
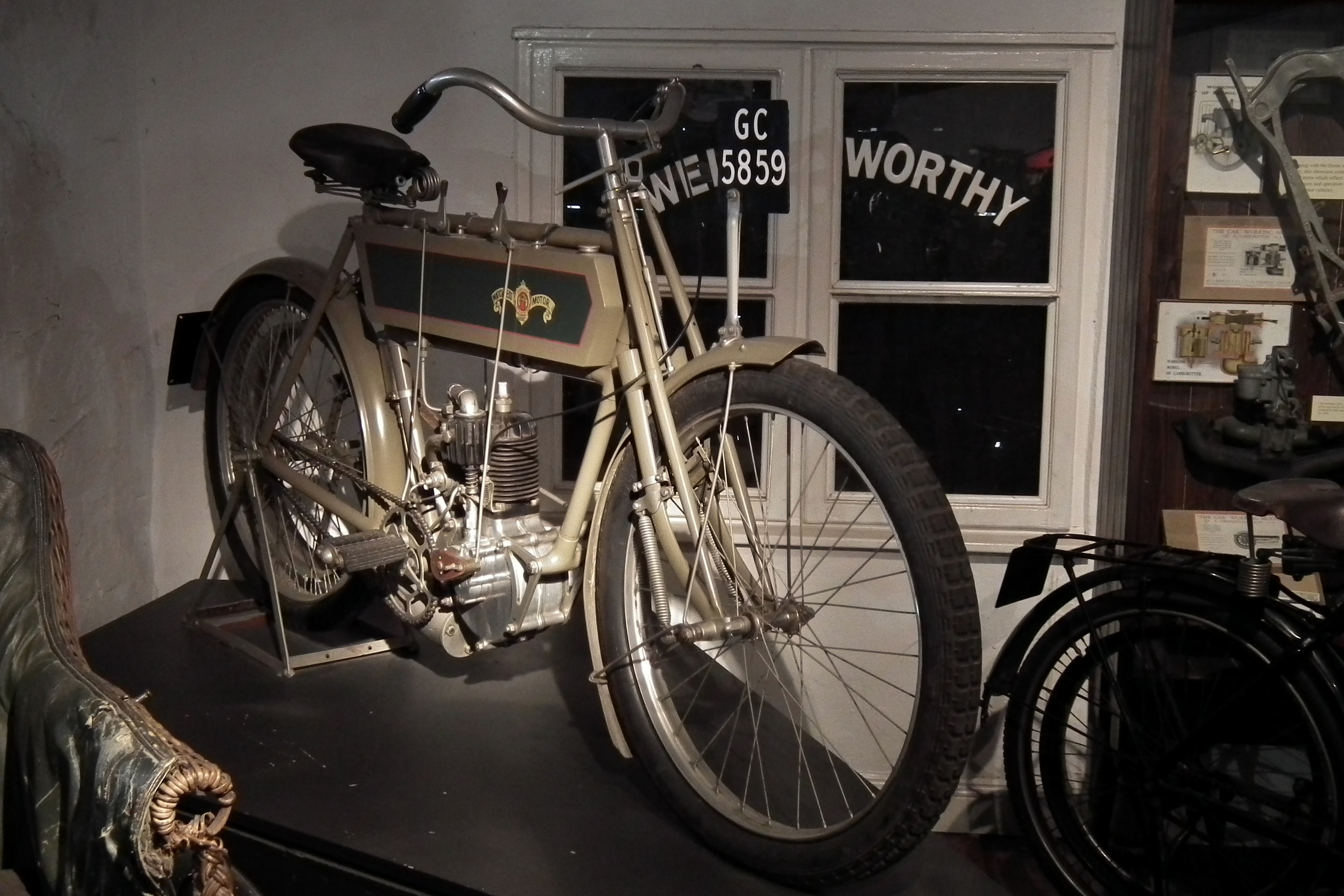
1905 Matchless 2½ hp motorcycle

Matchless was the trading name of Collier & Sons, operated by Henry Herbert Collier and his sons Charlie and Harry. The first motorcycle was made in 1899, and series production began in 1901. Like many motorcycle manufacturers of the time, it had started as a bicycle maker, and were still producing some 30 different models in 1936. They produced a JAP V-twin powered bike in 1905, with one of the earliest swing-arm rear suspensions, coupled with leading-link front forks.

Charlie won the inaugural TT singles race in 1907 at an average speed of 38.21 mph in a time of 4 hours 8 minutes 8 seconds. Harry did not finish in 1907, but won in 1909, and Charlie won again in 1910, bringing Matchless motorcycles to the attention of the public. Matchless made mostly singles, but they also made V-twins from 496 cc to 998 cc. They made their own engines from 1912 on.

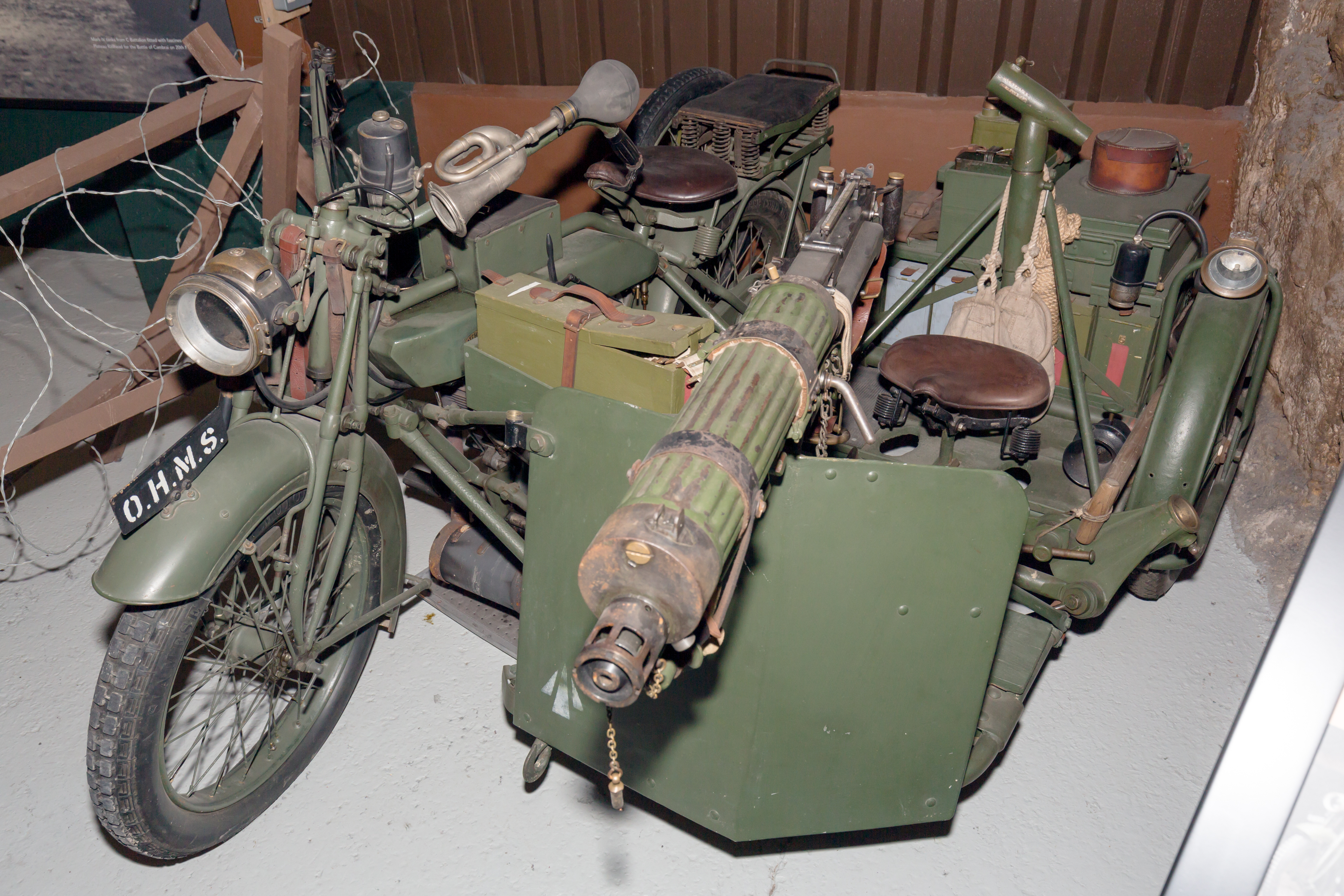
1916/1917 Matchless Vickers 8B2-M & sidecar

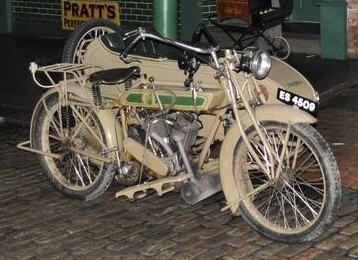
1922 Matchless Model H 1000cc motorcycle and sidecar combination at Beamish Museum

At the 1912 Olympia Motor Cycle and Cycle Car show Matchless showed a V-twin powered cycle car, with two wheels at the front and a single drive wheel at the rear. The drive was by shaft and bevel gear, which was unusual for the time. Additionally, the frame was made of pressed steel channel. It was priced at 100 guineas.

Matchless was not given a contract to make motorcycles for the army during the First World War, and production was shuttered until the end of hostilities. Peacetime production resumed in 1919, concentrating at first on V-twins for sidecar use, leaving singles until 1923. In 1926 Henry Collier died, and by 1928 Matchless was a limited company. The Silver Arrow, designed by Charlie and launched in 1929, was a side-valve v-twin with 54 × 86mm dimensions and a displacement of 394 cc. The two cylinders were set at 18 degrees within a single casting under a single head. The result looked odd, rather like a single that was too long, and with the exhaust emerging from the manifold at its right corner and the carburetor in the middle of the block on the left, the odd appearance was accentuated, and in 1930 they launched an (advanced for the time) 593 cc OHC V-four, the Silver Hawk. About 60 examples of the 500 units built survive; the Hawk was designed by youngest brother Bert, who had become active in the company and remained responsible for design right up to the Second World War.

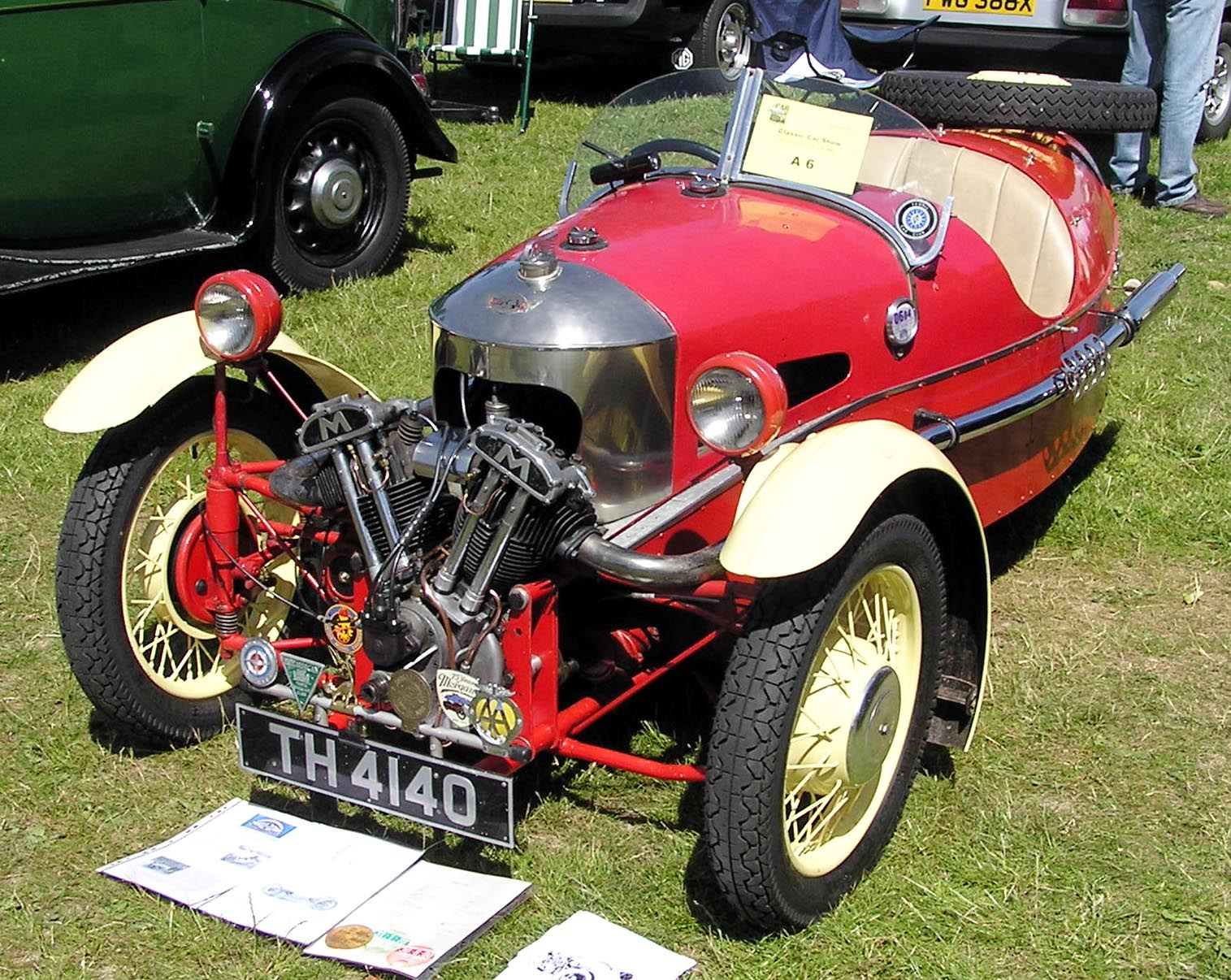
1934 Morgan Super Sports with Matchless engine

In 1931 Matchless bought AJS from the Stevens brothers. Matchless also bought Sunbeam in the late thirties, but sold it to BSA in 1943.

After that time, the only "true" AJS models, as far as AJS enthusiasts were concerned, were the racing 7Rs, Porcupines and the pre-war AJS Four. The shared models were considered by some AJS fans to be only badge-engineered Matchless models. In 1935 the Matchless/AJS hairpin valve springs made their first appearance. Matchless supplied engines for the V-twin versions of the Morgan three-wheeler from 1933 until Morgan production was halted by the outbreak of World War II in 1939. From 1935 on they were Morgan's exclusive supplier of V-twin engines. A dozen surviving unused engines were still in storage at the Morgan works in 1946 and were used to build a final batch of V-Twin trikes for a Morgan dealer in Australia. Matchless also supplied engines after 1935 to 1940 to the Brough Superior works. These engines were made to the specifications of Brough Superior and are not identical to similar engines used in Matchless motorcycles. The Brough Superior engines used a fork and blade rod configuration, cams ground to different specification, and larger ports in the cylinders or heads.

=== AMC (1938–66) ===
Associated Motor Cycles (AMC) was formed in 1938, as a parent company for Matchless and AJS motorcycles. AMC later (postwar) absorbed Francis-Barnett, James, and Norton. In 1941 Matchless motorcycles introduced telescopic front forks called "Teledraulic" forks, considered by some to be the first major innovation in British front suspension in 25 years.

During the Second World War, Matchless manufactured 80,000 G3 and G3L models for the armed forces. By 1956 they had eight models in their line up, but the number had dwindled in 1965. The G3L was the first to feature the "Teledraulic" front forks.

Post-war landmarks start with the production of Matchless/AJS 350 cc and Matchless G80 500 cc singles, developed from the legendary war-time Matchless G3 produced for the army. Competition models of the singles were produced from 1948, which gave the company some memorable wins.

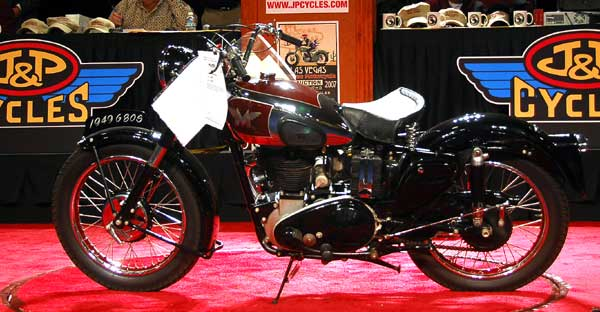
1949 Matchless G80S at auction in 2007

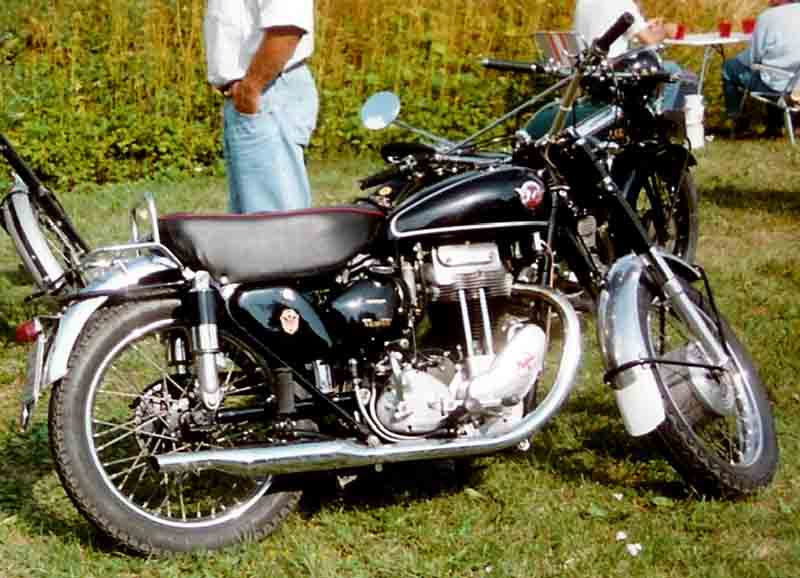
Matchless

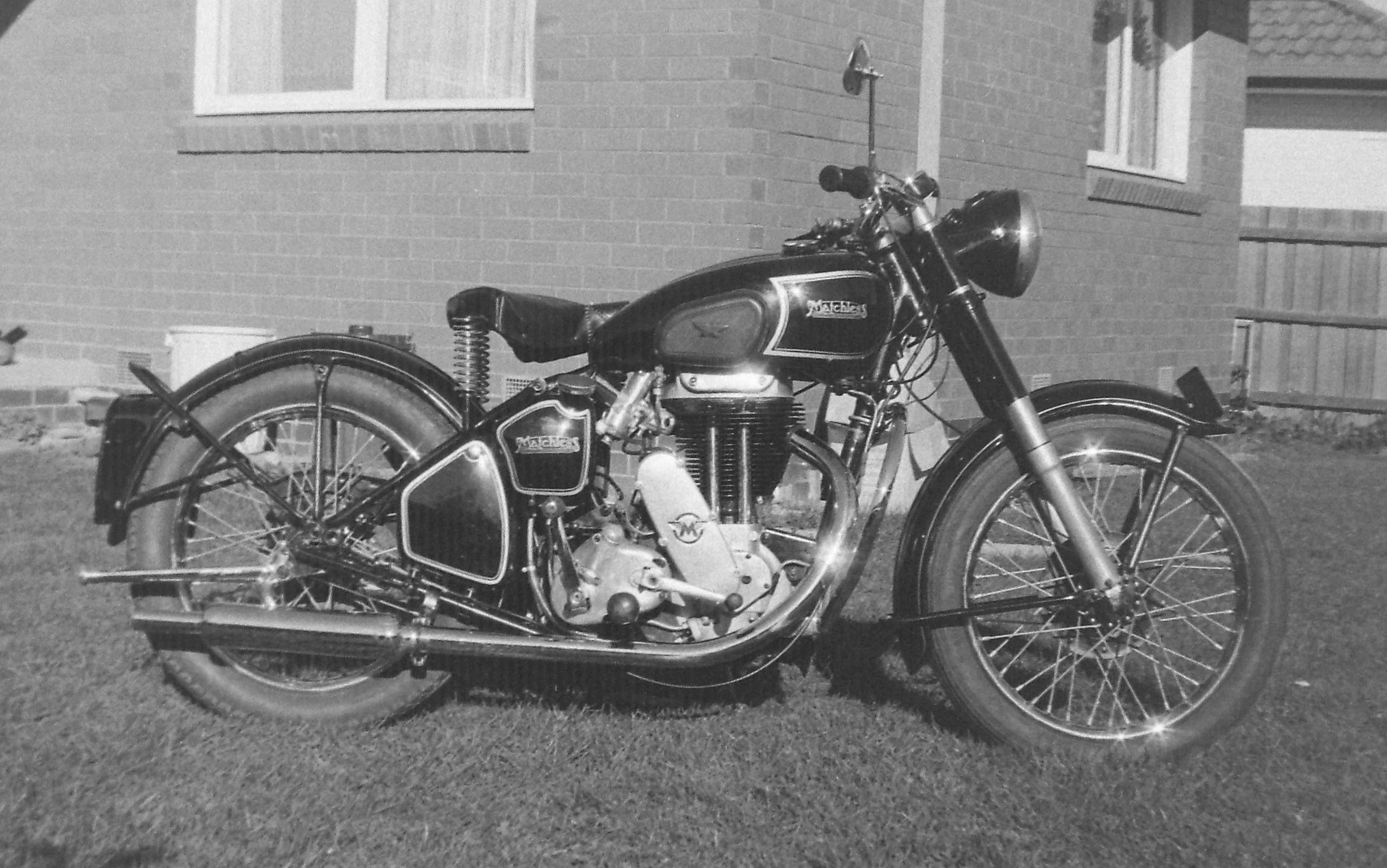
1950 Matchless G80

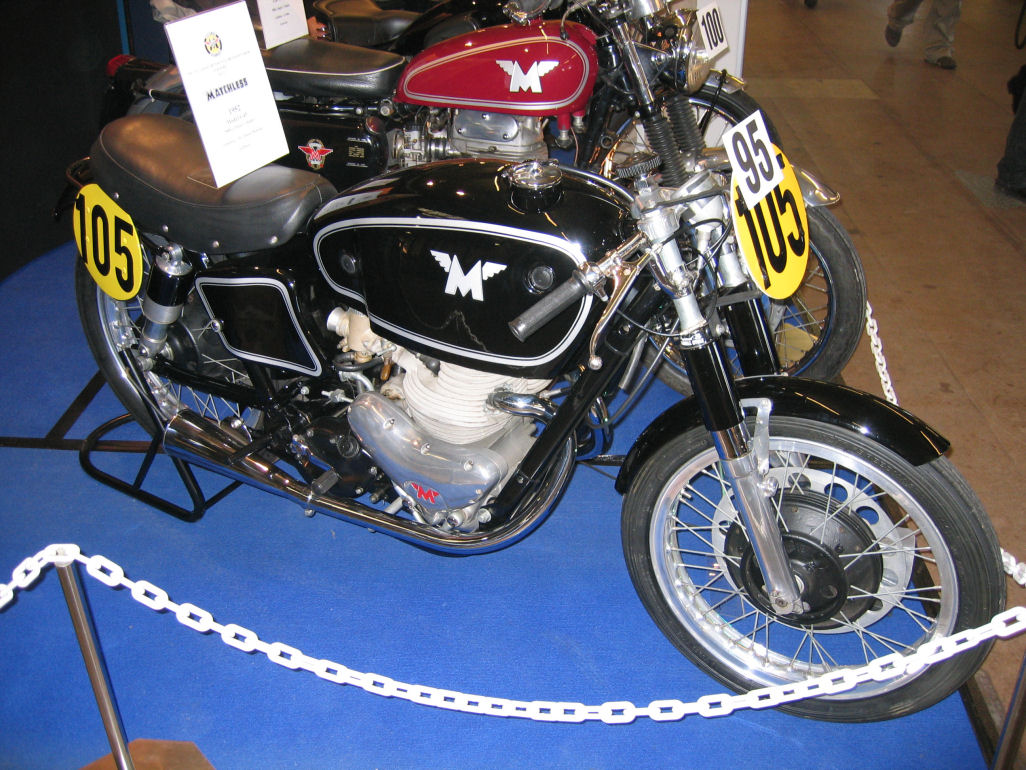
Matchless G45

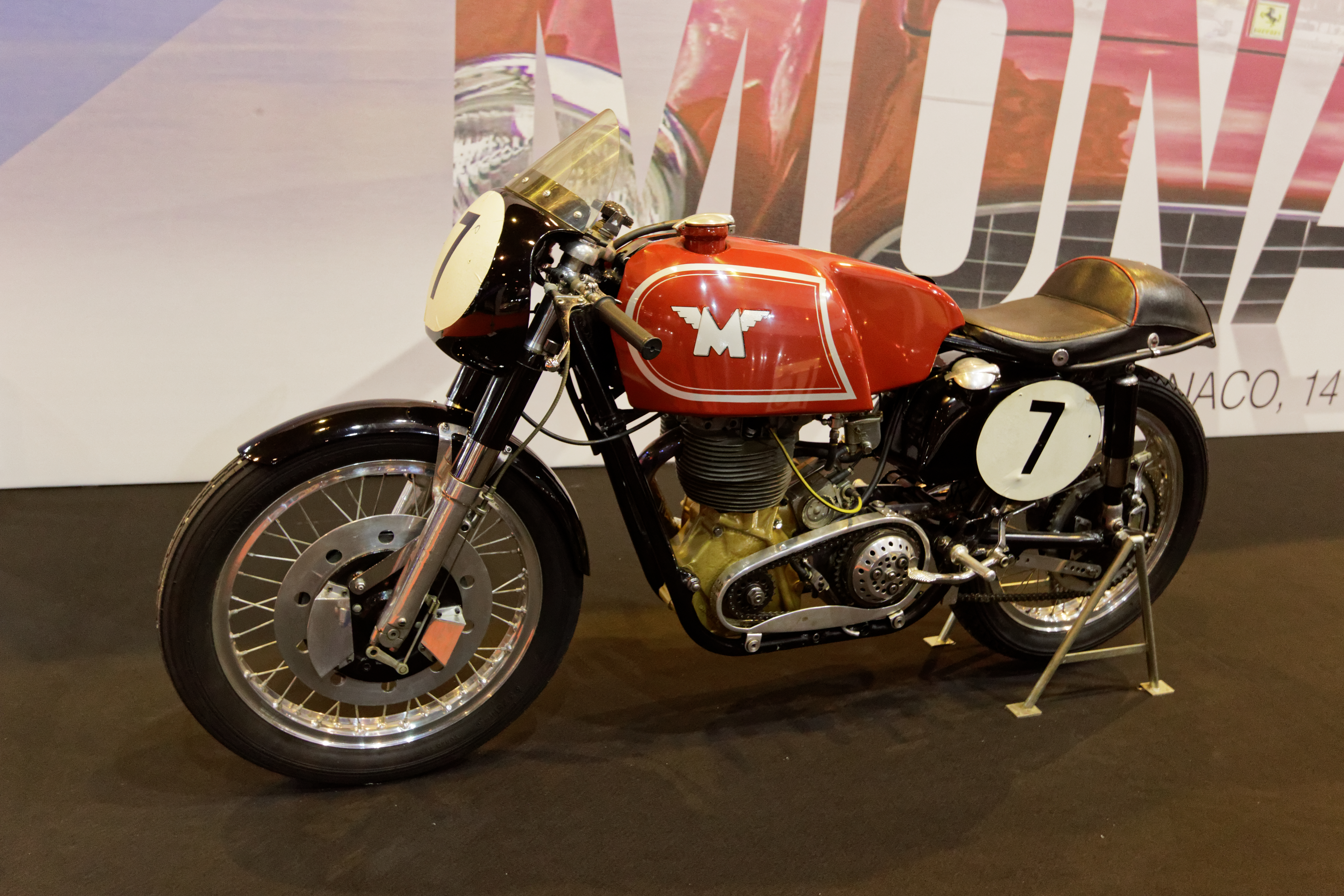
1959(?) Matchless G50 500 cc

In 1949 the first Matchless/AJS vertical twin, a 500 cc, was produced; later to be joined by 600 cc and 650 cc vertical twins in 1956 and 1959 respectively. On the racing front AMC were fielding the (supercharged) AJS Porcupine and the AJS 7R alongside the 1951 Matchless G45 500 cc vertical twin. Even when supercharging was banned, Les Graham won the 1949 500 cc world championship on a normally aspirated Porcupine.

For 1952, the Model G45 twin-cylinder production racer was introduced. Its pushrod 500 cc OHV vertical twin-cylinder engine was based on the roadster Model G9, and was housed in a modified AJS 7R chassis. Derek Farrant won the 1952 Manx Grand Prix at 88.65 mph, and AMC put the G45 into limited production.

In 1953, Matchless/AJS introduced a Clubman range of 350 cc and 500 cc singles. AMC withdrew from factory-supported road racing at the end of the 1954 season, following the death of Ike Hatch, and facing fierce competition from the other European bikes.

The Matchless G50 single-cylinder racer was made generally available for privateers in 1959, and competed against the Norton Manx. Though its 90.0 × 78.0 mm 50 bhp engine and top speed near 135 mph (217 km/h) were slightly down on the Manx, the lighter Matchless could outperform the Manx on tight and twisty circuits.

In 1958 the Matchless/AJS road bikes were joined by a 250 cc and in 1960 by a 350 cc for a lightweight series of singles.

In 1960 Bert Hopwood resigned from AMC and joined Triumph. That same year AMC posted a profit of a little over £200,000, in comparison to BSA's £3.5 million. That was followed by a loss of £350,000 in 1961. With the closure of the Norton plant at Birmingham in 1962 and the merger of Norton and Matchless production, the future was beginning to look rather bleak. In the sixties, with sales declining AMC made the commercial decision to focus on the Norton twins and the Matchless/AJS singles but they were not to be successful and the factory ceased production shortly afterwards.

With the G15 line, AMC built on the merits of the G12 but there were numerous changes to frame, forks, swinging arm, primary chaincase, transmission, cycle parts and lubrication system. The P11 was the last line of bikes with ties to AMC. It used a modified G85CS frame but there were stronger forks, completely new cycle parts (some of which were rather costly), altered lubrication and modified primary chaincases, to mention a few.

The G15 series was offered as 3 brands: Matchless G15 comprising G15Mk2, G15CS and G15CSR; AJS Model 33 comprising M33Mk2, M33CS and M33CSR; and last not least Norton N15CS (no Norton-branded roadster made as it would compete against the Atlas). The G15 series was produced from 1963 to 1969. They were initially for export only, but by 1965 these models were available in UK and Europe too.

The Matchless G85CS used a 12:1 compression 500 cc with an improved bottom end, and a Norton gear-driven oil pump replacing the old reciprocating design that dated back to the 1920s. The revised bottom end was introduced for 1964 and is shared by 350/500 roadsters and the 500CS (G80CS and M18CS), the engine of which was later adapted to the G85CS. The new lubrication system helped lubricating the big end and piston as well as the top end on the high-performance singles. The G85CS was further tuned for 1966, and received a new piston providing a CR of 12.5:1. An Amal GP carburettor was standard fitting, making the bike difficult to start. Maximum power rose to 41 bhp @ 6,500 rpm.

Matchless/AJS built predictable handling, comfortable, well-made, reliable and economical motorcycles, for their day. Unfortunately such attributes were not enough to keep them in business. Continuing poor sales led to AMC becoming part of a new company, called Norton-Villiers in 1966.

=== Norton Villiers (1966–73) ===
In 1966 Associated Motorcycles went bankrupt and was taken over by Manganese Bronze Holdings, who formed Norton-Villiers to oversee operations. At the time Norton was the only motorcycle marque in the company that was making money. There was a P11 series which comprised the following four models; P11 (1967), P11A (1968) and P11A Ranger (1968/69) and the P11 Ranger 750 (1969). It is believed that production of the G15 series was halted late in 1968 (model year '69) with unsold samples on offer through 1969. The P11 series carried on in production until the spring of 1969. The P11 was offered either as Norton or Matchless, but by heritage it is a Matchless bike.

=== Les Harris (1987) ===
A new Harris Matchless G80 single was released in 1987 powered by an Austrian Rotax 4-stroke, single over-head cam (SOHC), 500 cc engine. Components from Italy such as front and rear Paioli suspension and Brembo disc brakes were used whilst, harking back to his licence-built Triumph Bonneville T140s, the frame doubled up as the oil tank. The model was offered in colours of silver, black or metallic burgundy. Although electric start and twin disc brakes were options, priced at £2700 (£500 more than a Yamaha motorcycle of similar specification), this was not a successful product and production ended by the early 1990s.

== In popular culture ==
- The song lyrics of the song "Little Honda", first released by The Beach Boys on the album All Summer Long from 1964, mentions the brand in the line "It climbs the hills like a Matchless".

== See also ==
- List of AMC motorcycles
- Matchless G3/L
- Matchless G80
- Matchless Model 7
- List of car manufacturers of the United Kingdom
- List of motorcycles of 1900 to 1909
- List of motorcycles of the 1910s
- List of motorcycles of the 1920s
