= Mount Panorama Circuit =

Motor racing circuit in New South Wales, Australia

Mount Panorama
The Mountain
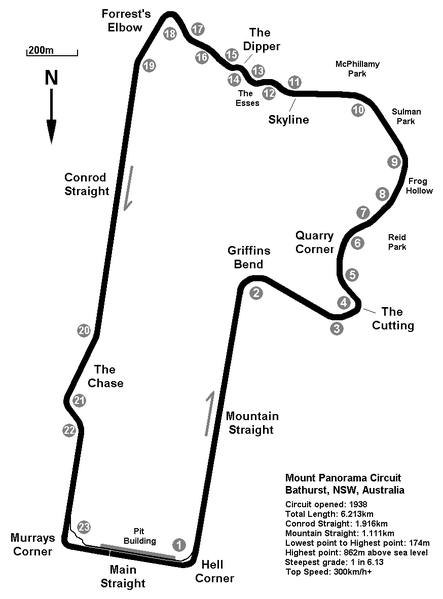
- Full Circuit (1987–present)
- Location: Bathurst, New South Wales, Australia
- Coordinates: 33°26′51″S 149°33′23″E
- FIA Grade: 3
- Opened: 17 March 1938; 88 years ago
- Major events: Current: Supercars; Bathurst 1000 (1963–present); Bathurst 500 (1966, 1969–1970, 1972, 1995–1996, 2021, 2024); Intercontinental GT Challenge; Bathurst 12 Hour (1991–1994, 2007–2020, 2022–present); Bathurst 6 Hour (2016–2019, 2021–present); Future: GT World Challenge Australia (1960, 2006–2007, 2009–2011, 2013, 2019–2024, 2027); Former: TCR World Tour (2023); Australian Grand Prix (1938, 1947, 1952, 1958); Australian motorcycle Grand Prix (1940, 1946, 1952, 1966–1968, 1978, 1983, 1986, 1988); Bathurst 24 Hour (2002–2003); Australian Drivers' Championship Bathurst 100 (1940–1969); Australian Tourist Trophy (1958, 1961)

Full Circuit (1987–present)
- Length: 6.213 km (3.861 mi)
- Turns: 23
- Race lap record: 1:59.2910 ( (Germany) Christopher Mies, Audi R8 LMS, 2018, GT3 (unrestricted))

Original Circuit (1938–1986)
- Length: 6.172 km (3.835 mi)
- Turns: 20
- Race lap record: 2:09.7 ( (Australia) Niel Allen, McLaren M10B, 1970, F5000)

Mount Panorama Circuit is a motor racing track located in Bathurst, New South Wales, Australia. It is situated on Mount Panorama and is best known as the home of the Bathurst 1000 motor race held each October, and the Bathurst 12 Hour event held each February. The track is a 6.213 km (3.861 mi) long street circuit, which is used as a public road when no racing events are being run, with many residences which can only be accessed from the circuit.

The track has an unusual design by modern standards, with a 174 m (571 ft) vertical difference between its highest and lowest points, and grades as steep as 1:6.13. From the start-finish line, the track can be viewed in three sections; the short pit straight and then a tight left turn into the long, steep Mountain straight; the tight, narrow section across the top of the mountain itself; and then the long, downhill section of Conrod Straight, with the very fast Chase and the turn back onto the pit straight to complete the lap.

Historically, the racetrack has been used for a wide variety of racing categories, including everything from open-wheel racers to motorcycles. With tighter safety regulations and less tolerance of risk, motorcycle racing is no longer conducted at the circuit, and open-wheel racing events did not occur for many years until a Formula 3 event was added as a support race for the Bathurst 12 Hour in 2012. It is registered as a Grade 3 racing circuit by the FIA. Grade 3 racing circuits are permitted to hold FIA-sanctioned events with cars with a weight/power ratio of 2–3 kg/hp, which includes all current Australian domestic racing categories except S5000 (which were consequently modified to reduce maximum power for the event held there).

As a public road, on non-race days and when it is not closed off during the day as part of a racing event, Mount Panorama is open to the public. Cars can drive in both directions around the circuit for no charge, though the speed limit of 60 km/h (37 mph) is strictly enforced by the New South Wales Police who regularly patrol the circuit. The National Motor Racing Museum is located next to the Mount Panorama Circuit.

The venue's infield and pit parking served as the home of the 2023 World Athletics Cross Country Championships.

== Early history ==
Prior to European settlement, the area was home to the Wiradjuri people. The Wiradjuri called Mount Panorama Wahluu, meaning "to watch over", and it was an initiation site for young men. According to the Dreamtime, a warrior named Wahluu was killed by his brother in a dispute over a young woman – the bloodspill upset Baiame, who caused a volcanic eruption around Wahluu's body to form the mountain of today.

The area's racing history dates back to the 1900s. A man by the name of Dr. Machattie persuaded two local builders to drive from Melbourne to Bathurst- a 793 km (493 mi) drive in his steam-powered Thomson. Various circuits made up of public roads made up of dirt and tarmac were raced on starting in 1906. Until 1913, races took place on the 33.0 km (20.5 mi) Peel-Limekilns circuit, then from 1914 to 1925 the 24.9 km (15.5 mi) Yetholme circuit was used, then the incredibly long 100.6 km (62.5 mi) Sunny Corner (also known as the Mount Horrible circuit) circuit was used from 1926 to 1930 and the 11 km (7 mi) Vale Circuit was used from 1931 to 1937. Construction of the Mount Panorama circuit commenced in mid-1936. The first race meeting, for motorcycles, was held on 16 April 1938 and the first race, the 1938 Junior Tourist Trophy, was won by 20 year old Queenslander Les Sherrin riding a Norton. The first car race, the 1938 Australian Grand Prix, was held two days later and was won by Peter Whitehead driving an ERA.

Original layout of Mount Panorama Circuit used between 1938 and 1986

== The circuit ==
It also has the fastest corner in touring car racing,, the kink at the entrance to the Chase. French sportscar driver Alexandre Prémat, who later raced as a Supercars regular, once described the circuit as "A mix of the (Nürburgring) Nordschleife, Petit Le Mans (Road Atlanta) and Laguna Seca". Nürburgring 24 Hours winner Kévin Estre claimed that "half of the track is the Nordschleife, half of the track is Macau".

=== The Pit Straight ===
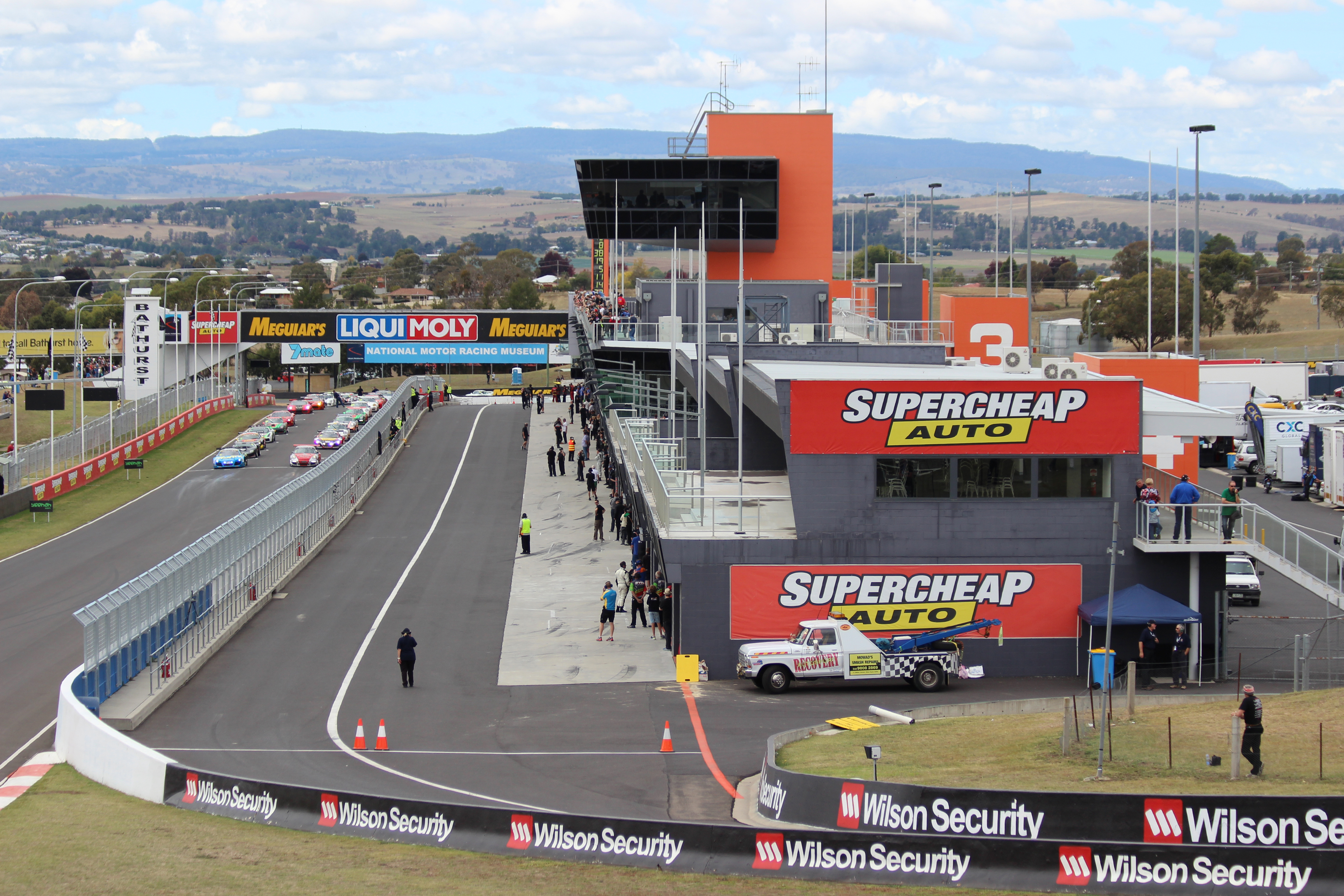
Pit Straight and the pit lane as viewed from Hell Corner, with cars lined up on the starting grid in preparation for a race

The Pit Straight of Mount Panorama, which is adjacent to the pit complex, has a different start line and finish line. For the standing start only, the start line is 143 m (156 yd) closer to Hell Corner so that traffic does not go too far around Murray's Corner when the start grid is formed. The finish line is positioned such that all of the pit bays are located after it.

=== Hell Corner ===
The common misconception of nomenclature due to the accidents that happen at this turn are widespread. Hell Corner was named after a tree stump that existed on the apex of the turn. It was believed that any motorcycle riders who hit the stump would die in an act of folly and thereby be doomed to an eternity of birth.

=== Mountain Straight ===
Mountain Straight is a long straight that begins the climb up the mountain towards Griffins Bend. V8 Supercars reach speeds of up to 290 km/h (180 mph) before the braking point for Griffins Bend. In the days before modern aerodynamics, drivers would have to lift off the throttle to prevent becoming airborne over the crest halfway up the straight. The crest also caused problems during the old Easter motorbike races at the circuit with a number of riders having serious crashes due to not lifting before the crest and their bikes becoming airborne.

Since late 2022 a campaign is being run to have Mountain Straight renamed to Moffat Mountain Straight or Moffat Straight, honouring the Ford driver Allan Moffat and his fierce competition with Holden's Peter Brock, which personified the uniquely Australian Ford vs Holden rivalry. This rivalry popularised the annual 500 mile (later 1000KM) race and made it a national event, even for non motor sport followers.

=== Griffins Bend ===
Named after Martin Griffin, the Mayor of Bathurst whose vision it was to create the circuit, drivers heading around this right-hander have to be careful not to drift too far out of this negatively cambered turn and hit the wall upon exit. David Besnard crashed here in 2011 after he arrived at the corner in his Ford Falcon FG with insufficient front brake pressure having come straight out of the pit-lane with new brakes.

=== The Cutting ===
A pair of left hand corners leading into a steep 1 in 6 grade exit, overtaking in this section of circuit is difficult and it is very hard to recover from a spin here because of the narrow room and steep gradient. This corner was the location of the infamous 'race rage' incident between Marcos Ambrose and Greg Murphy. The pair collided when both drivers refused to give the other racing room late in the 2005 Supercheap Auto 1000, with the resulting incident partially blocking the circuit.

=== Quarry Corner ===
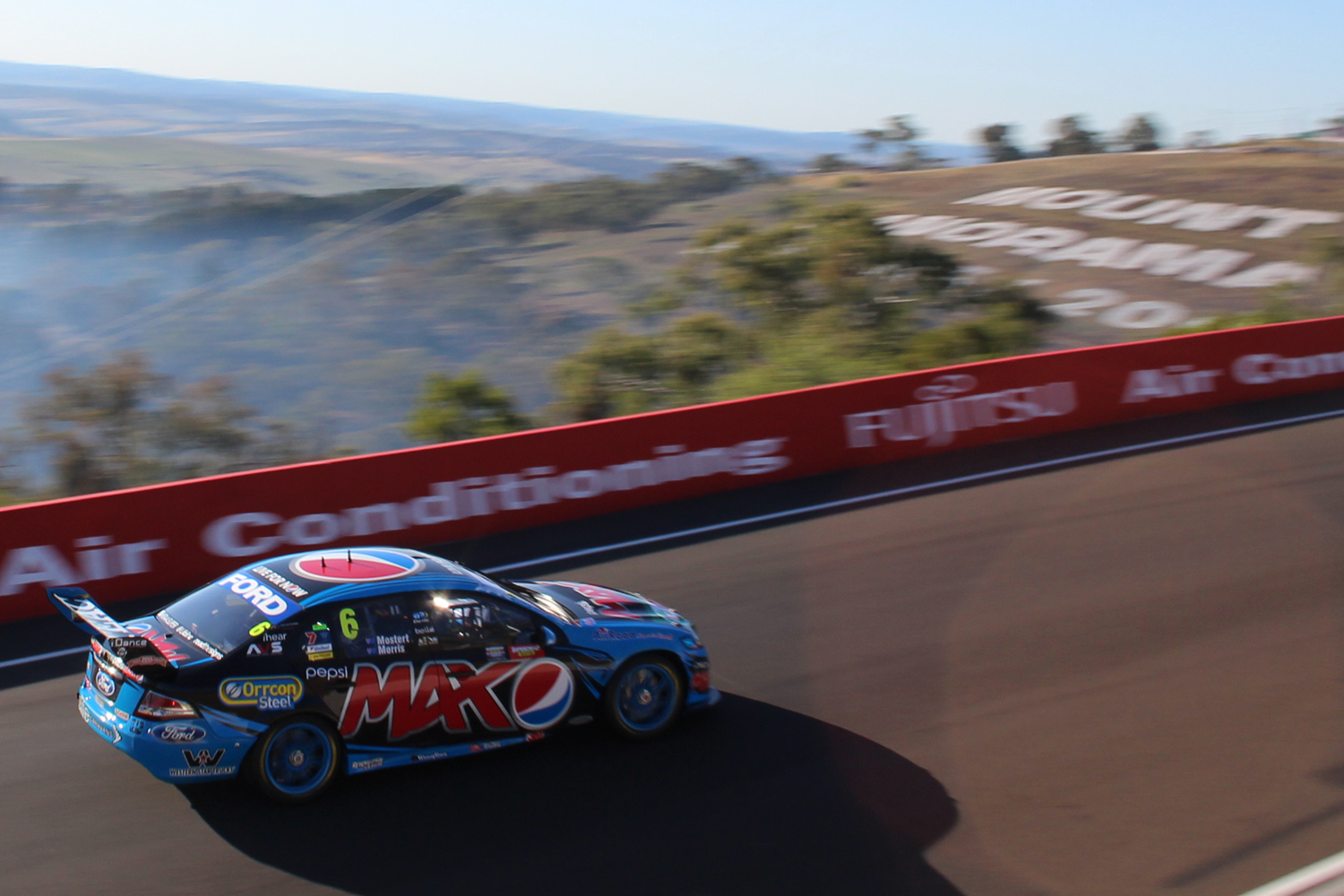
Chaz Mostert on the run between Quarry Corner and Reid Park

Sometimes confused with Griffins Bend, Quarry Corner is a right hander that immediately follows the Cutting. The corner is named after the quarry below the outside wall of the corner, accessible via an access road between it and the Cutting. As the circuit briefly flattens at the apex, drivers are sometimes required to short-shift between gears to avoid wheelspin. One of the most famous incidents in the history of the Bathurst 1000 occurred on the exit of this turn when Dick Johnson crashed his Ford Falcon XD out of the lead on lap 18 of the 1980 Hardie-Ferodo 1000. Johnson was unable to avoid a large rock that had been pushed from the spectator area as he was passing a quick-lift tow truck at the time and had nowhere else to go. The car was destroyed after running over the rock and hitting the outside concrete wall which the car almost leapt over (the wall had only been put in place prior to the 1979 Hardie-Ferodo 1000; before then the fence had consisted of railway sleepers and fence posts), taking with it Johnson's means of supporting his racing ambitions. An emotional public appeal followed during the race's telecast which re-launched Johnson's career.

=== Reid Park ===
Following Quarry, there is a loaded right-hand turn followed by an open left-hand turn. This is Reid Park, named after the Bathurst City engineer Hughie Reid, who redesigned sections of the track to be more suitable for motor racing. At the 1982 Bathurst 1000, Kevin Bartlett had a tyre blow out in the right-hander and pitch him into the inside wall for the left-hander, rolling his Chevrolet Camaro Z28 onto its roof and skidding across the track. Another high-profile incident occurred in the 2013 Bathurst 1000 when four-time winner Greg Murphy crashed at the exit of the right-hander on a dirty and dusty track surface.

=== Sulman Park ===
After Reid Park, there is a steep drop which flows into a climbing left-hand turn, heading towards the highest point of Mount Panorama. This is the location of Sulman Park and its nature park. Peter Brock had his first major crash at Bathurst here when he crashed his Holden Racing Team Commodore VP into retirement on lap 138 of the 1994 Tooheys 1000. Jason Bright crashed here in his Ford EL Falcon in practice during the 1998 FAI 1000. The car was then rebuilt in time to scrape into qualifying in the dying minutes before Bright and Steven Richards went on to take victory in the race. This corner was also the scene of a crash in a V8 Supercar Development Series race in 2006 that claimed the life of Mark Porter. Sulman Park is also commonly nicknamed "Metal Grate" after a drainage grate on the outside apron of the sequence at the point of maximum lateral and longitudinal load.

=== McPhillamy Park ===
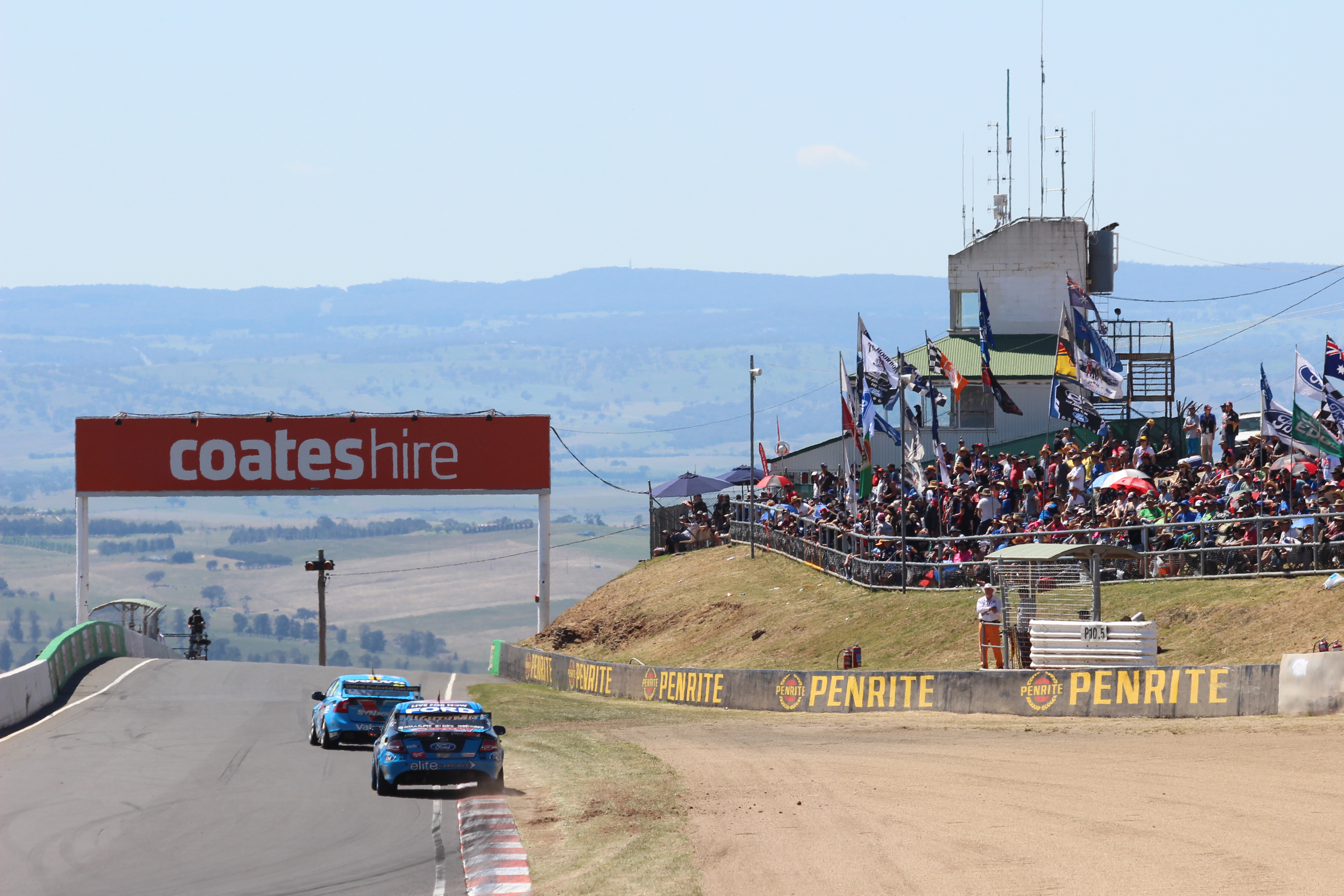
Cars on the run from McPhillamy Park to Brock's Skyline during the 2014 Bathurst 1000, with spectator areas at McPhillamy Park on the right

McPhillamy Park is a fast, downhill left-hand turn which is guarded by a crest prior to the turn-in point, rendering the corner blind to approaching drivers. Drivers have to stay close to the wall while turning so as not to run wide on exit. However, going too close may cause the car to clip the inside kerbing, which Allan Moffat did in practice for the 1986 James Hardie 1000, crashing the Holden Commodore VK, which he was sharing with long-time rival Peter Brock, head on into the concrete. British driver Win Percy, driving Allan Grice's Roadways Commodore VL, would complete an almost carbon copy of Moffat's crash in practice for the 1987 James Hardie 1000. McPhillamy Park is the location of the longest-running campsite for those who camp at the track (sometimes for over a week in advance of a race). The park was named after Walter J. McPhillamy, a previous mayor of the Bathurst City Council and the owner of most of the land occupied by the Bald Hills/Mt Panorama which he donated to the people of Bathurst as a scenic picnic area.

McPhillamy was the site of Bill Brown's rollover during the 1971 Hardie-Ferodo 500 when the front right tyre on his Ford Falcon XY GTHO Phase III blew at over 100 mph (161 km/h), sending Brown up an earth bank before barrel-rolling along the fence. A pair of marshals stationed at that point were lucky to escape being hit after taking evasive action. Amazingly, Brown suffered only minor cuts and bruises in the accident largely due to the driver's seat breaking in the initial impact (in those days, the cars were Series Production and thus had the road car seats). The famous corner was also the site of the crash between the Falcons of Bob Morris and Christine Gibson that blocked the track and stopped the 1981 James Hardie 1000 on lap 120, 43 laps short of race distance, giving Dick Johnson and John French the win.

In the interests of safety for both drivers and spectators at McPhillamy (and to open up the corner to avoid a repeat of the 1981 crash that blocked the track), the banking that had been just off the outside of the track was removed and pushed back approximately 30 m (33 yd) on an angle to allow a sand trap and concrete retaining wall to be put in place prior to the 1985 James Hardie 1000. With the increased speed of the cars over the years as both Supercars and GT3 cars lap the circuit approximately 20+ seconds faster than the Group A cars did in 1985 with most of the gains being a much faster run across the top of the mountain, for safety reasons this sand trap has grown larger over time.

=== Brock's Skyline ===
A short straight connects McPhillamy to the next corner. Skyline is a sharply descending right hand corner which signifies the beginning of the descent from the top of the circuit. The corner acquired the name from the visual effect of looking upwards at the corner from below, such is the sharpness of that initial plunge. During the 1970 Hardie-Ferodo 500, 1969 co-winner Tony Roberts lost control of his Ford Falcon XW GTHO and launched over the Skyline backwards before tumbling down the hillside.

In late 1997 Skyline was renamed as Brock's Skyline to honour the nine time 500 mile (later 1000KM) race winner. Following his fatal crash in a Western Australian car rally, a statue of the driver many call "The King of the Mountain" stands outside the motorsport museum near Murray's Corner.

=== The Esses and The Dipper ===
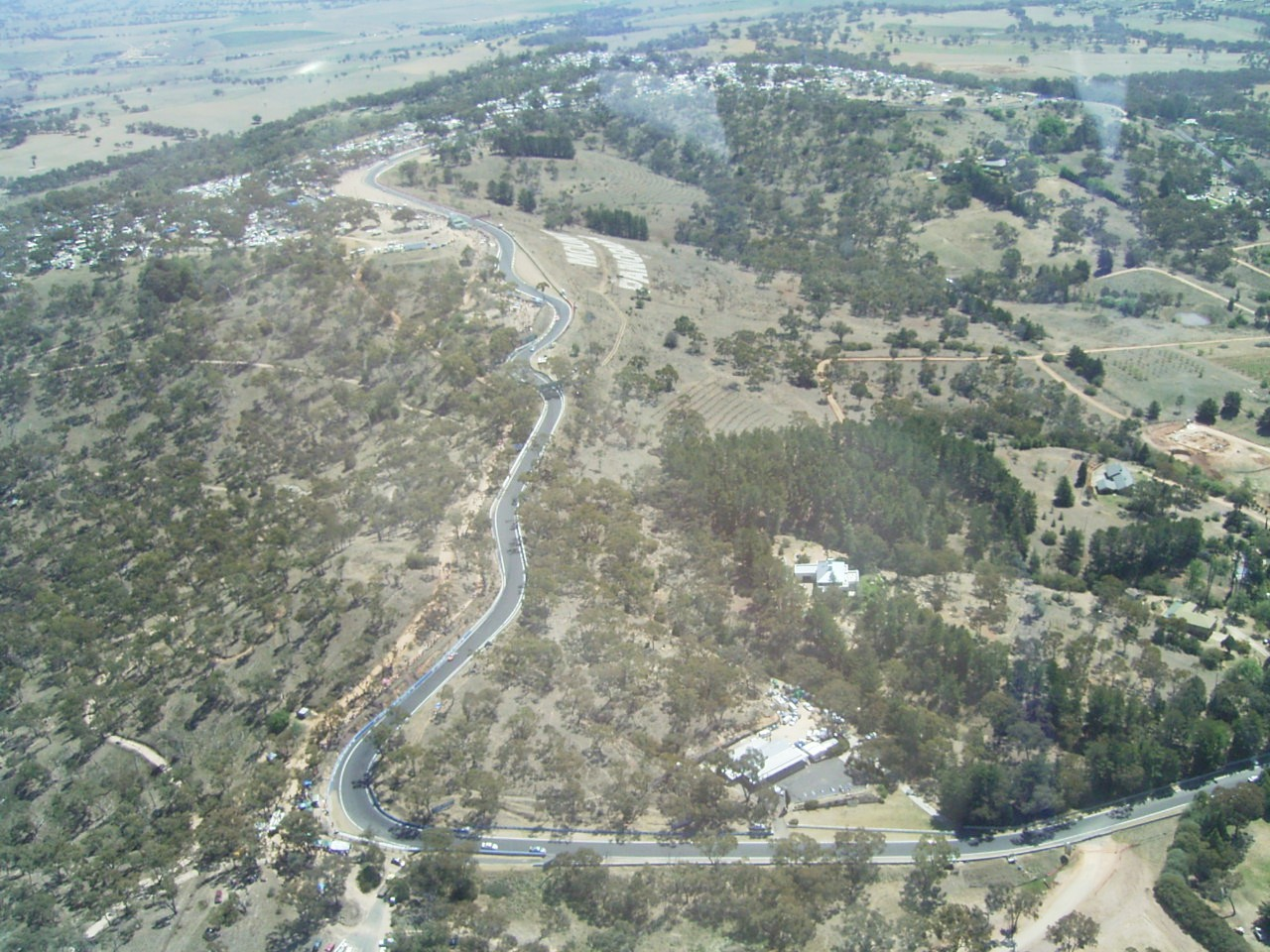
The run down the mountain, looking from Forrest's Elbow to Skyline and beyond

The Esses are the series of corners which begin at Skyline and stretch down the Mountain towards Forrest's Elbow. There have been many notable accidents at this part of the circuit, including a blockage of the track in 2003 when Jason Bargwanna made contact with David Brabham. The most famous of the Esses, the Dipper (the third corner in the sequence), is a sharp left hand corner so named because, before safety changes were made, there was a dip in the road surface and a steep drop not far from the edge of the road, and many cars were able to get two wheels off the ground, which has often been compared to the Corkscrew at Laguna Seca. Chaz Mostert had a severe accident in the lower Esses during qualifying for the Great Race in 2015. Mostert clipped the inside wall on the run down to Forrest's Elbow, ricocheting the car into the outside wall before it eventually mounted a concrete barrier and clipped the roof of a marshals' post. The car then slid down the track and came to a halt at the apex of Forrest's Elbow. The accident saw the entry withdrawn from the event and caused qualifying to be red flagged and postponed. Mostert suffered season-ending leg and wrist injuries as his leg made contact with the floor shifter in the crash.

=== Forrest's Elbow ===
Forrest's Elbow is named after Arthur Ronald 'Jack' Forrest (19 February 1920 – 12 August 2002), an Australian motor cycle racer born in Wellington, New South Wales. 'Jack' crashed his Norton International during the first day of official practice during the October 1947 Bathurst meeting and ground the end off his elbow. Following the crash, the corner initially described as 'The Elbow' or as 'Devil's Elbow' was re-dubbed as (Jack) Forrest's Elbow by fellow Australian rider Harry Hinton, much to the amusement of everyone (except for Jack) in the Mount Panorama pits. Forrest's Elbow is geographically positioned as a slow, descending left-hand turn that leads on to the long Conrod Straight. Alternatively it is described as a severely downhill and adverse camber left hander leading onto Conrod Straight. The corner's line drifts towards the outside wall on exit and drivers have to be careful of getting too close. It was on the exit of the corner that Dick Johnson clipped a tyre barrier during the top ten shootout for the 1983 James Hardie 1000, which broke the car's steering and sent Johnson off into a grove of trees and demolishing the car. This is also where Craig Lowndes aquaplaned into the tyre wall in 2001.

=== Conrod Straight ===
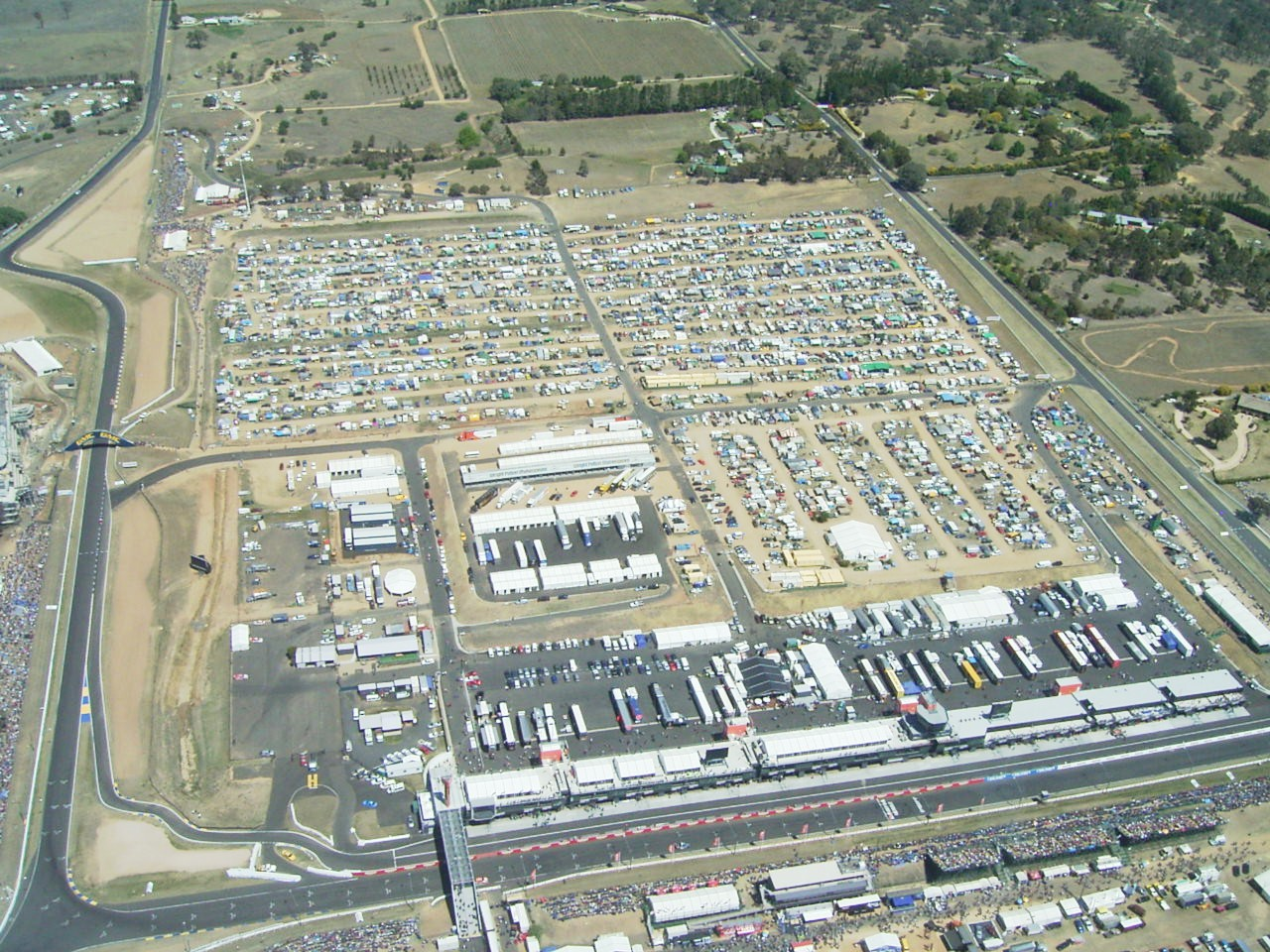
The Chase (top left), followed by Murray's Corner and the Pit Straight

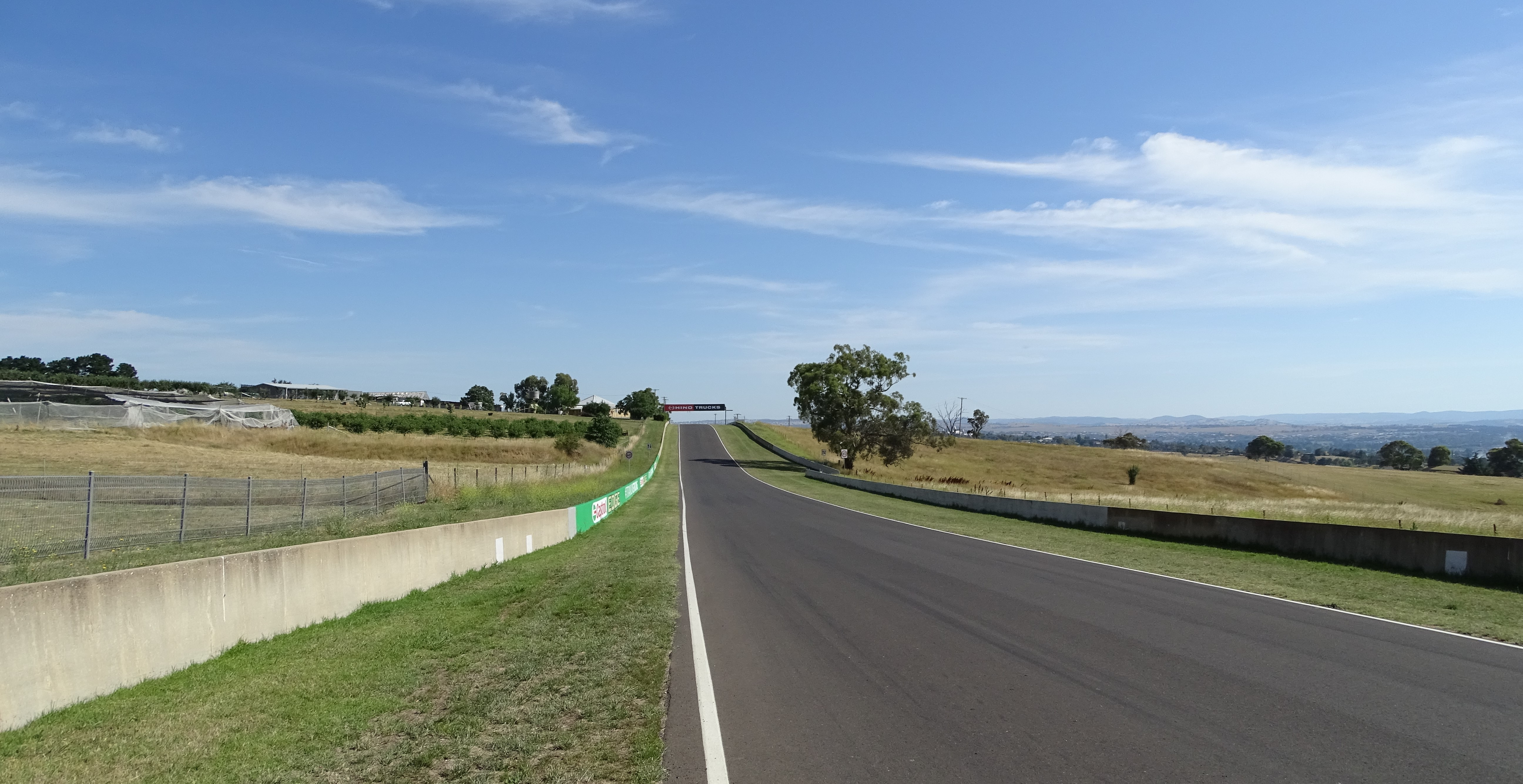
Conrod Straight

Formerly known as Main Straight, Conrod Straight was so named because of a con-rod failure that ended the 1939 Easter race of Frank Kleinig in his Kleinig/Hudson racecar. At 1.916 km (1.191 mi), Conrod Straight is the fastest section of Mount Panorama, with V8 Supercars almost reaching 300 km/h (190 mph). The straight is a roller-coaster ride featuring two distinct crests, the second of which was rebuilt in 1987. Conrod Straight has been the scene of six of the seven car racing deaths on the circuit – Reg Smith, Bevan Gibson, Tom Sulman, Mike Burgmann, Denny Hulme and Don Watson. All except 1967 Formula One World Champion Denny Hulme (heart attack) died in high-speed accidents. However, the chicane introduced into Conrod Straight reduced the top speed of cars going down the straight and has created one of the fastest corners in the world. Most drivers arrive at the initial part of the chicane at over 290 km/h (180 mph). Prior to the introduction of The Chase in 1987, Conrod Straight was a mile-long straight where the faster cars were getting airborne over the second hump, which was a contributing factor in Burgmann's accident.

The fastest ever speed recorded by a touring car on the old straight was by Scotland's Tom Walkinshaw driving a V12 Jaguar XJS during qualifying for the 1984 James Hardie 1000. Walkinshaw was timed at 290 km/h (180 mph). Ironically, while the Chase was introduced in an effort to reduce terminal speeds on Conrod, by the 1990 Tooheys 1000, the turbocharged Ford Sierra RS500s were achieving higher speeds than pre-1987 with Tony Longhurst reportedly being timed at 295 km/h (183 mph) during official qualifying for the race. Shane van Gisbergen would later hit a speed of 300.5 km/h (186.7 mph) during a pre-race session for the 2023 Bathurst 1000.

=== The Chase ===
Known for many years as "Caltex Chase", this three-turn sequence was added in preparation for the World Touring Car Championship round in 1987 to comply with a FIA requirement that a straight could not exceed 1,200 m (1,300 yd). It interrupts Conrod Straight with a fast right hand bend sometimes referred as "The Kink," based on international motorsport commentator Mike Joy comparing it to Road America's Kink during a United States broadcast of the Bathurst 1000 in 2011, descending to the right away from the crest prior to the spectator bridge, before a sharp 120 km/h (75 mph) left-hand bend. A right-hand corner then returns the cars to Conrod Straight for the run down to Murray's Corner. The section was dedicated to Mike Burgmann, who died in an accident at the chicane's spot in the previous year.

This corner was the scene of Peter Brock's only rollover in his motor racing career when he rolled his Vauxhall Vectra during practice for the 1997 AMP Bathurst 1000. The Chase has been the scene of numerous other rollover accidents: Tomas Mezera during the 1997 Bathurst 1000, John Cleland during the 2004 Bathurst 1000 after he clipped a slower car he didn't see until too late, Len Cave during the 2008 WPS Bathurst 12 Hour, Allan Letcher in a V8 Utes race during the 2009 Bathurst 1000 event, Fabian Coulthard during the 2010 Bathurst 1000 because of a left-rear tyre issue, and Damien Flack during an Aussie Racing Cars race during the 2015 Bathurst 1000 event. Another notable accident to happen in the area is when Scott McLaughlin made contact with Garth Tander on a redress attempt late in the 2016 Bathurst 1000 (for which Jamie Whincup, who had bumped Scott off the road a few seconds prior, would be penalized).

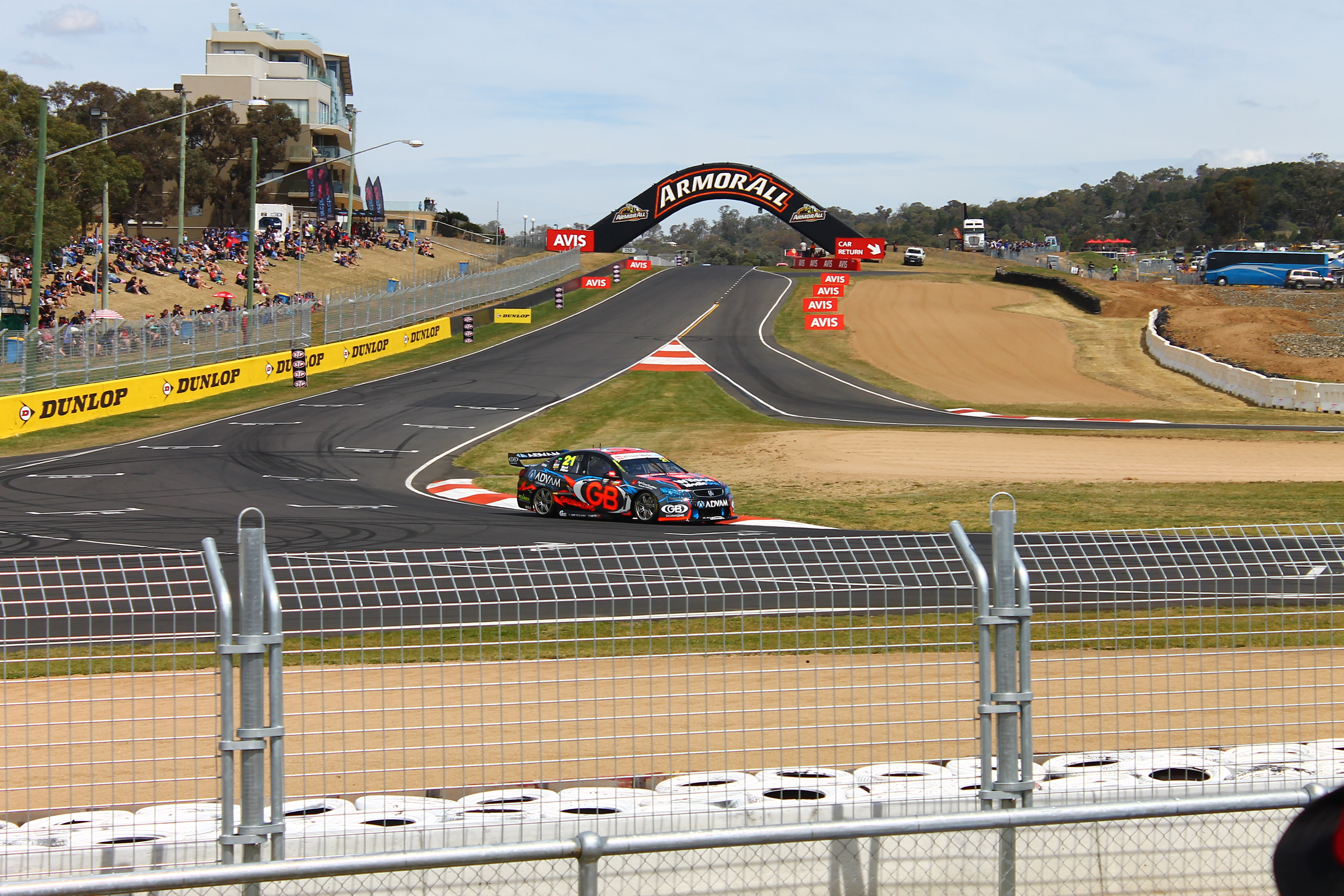
Murray's Corner

Don Watson was killed in an accident at the Chase during qualifying for the 1994 Bathurst 1000 when his Holden VP Commodore blew a brake disc when he attempted to slow for the kink, leaving him without brakes and limited steering. His car failed to slow and take the right hand kink, instead continuing at undiminished speed across the sand trap before hitting the tyre wall head on and flipping on to its roof, coming to rest on the wall. Watson initially survived the crash but later died from his injuries in Bathurst Base Hospital. The accident occurred in front of former race winners Peter Brock and England's Win Percy, who described it as a "major accident".

=== Murray's Corner ===
Murray's Corner is the final corner before Pit Straight and the lowest point of the circuit. It is a 90-degree left hand turn, and is a good overtaking spot as drivers hold braking duels for the corner. It was previously called Pit Corner before Bill Murray crashed his Hudson racing car there in 1946.

== Lap records ==
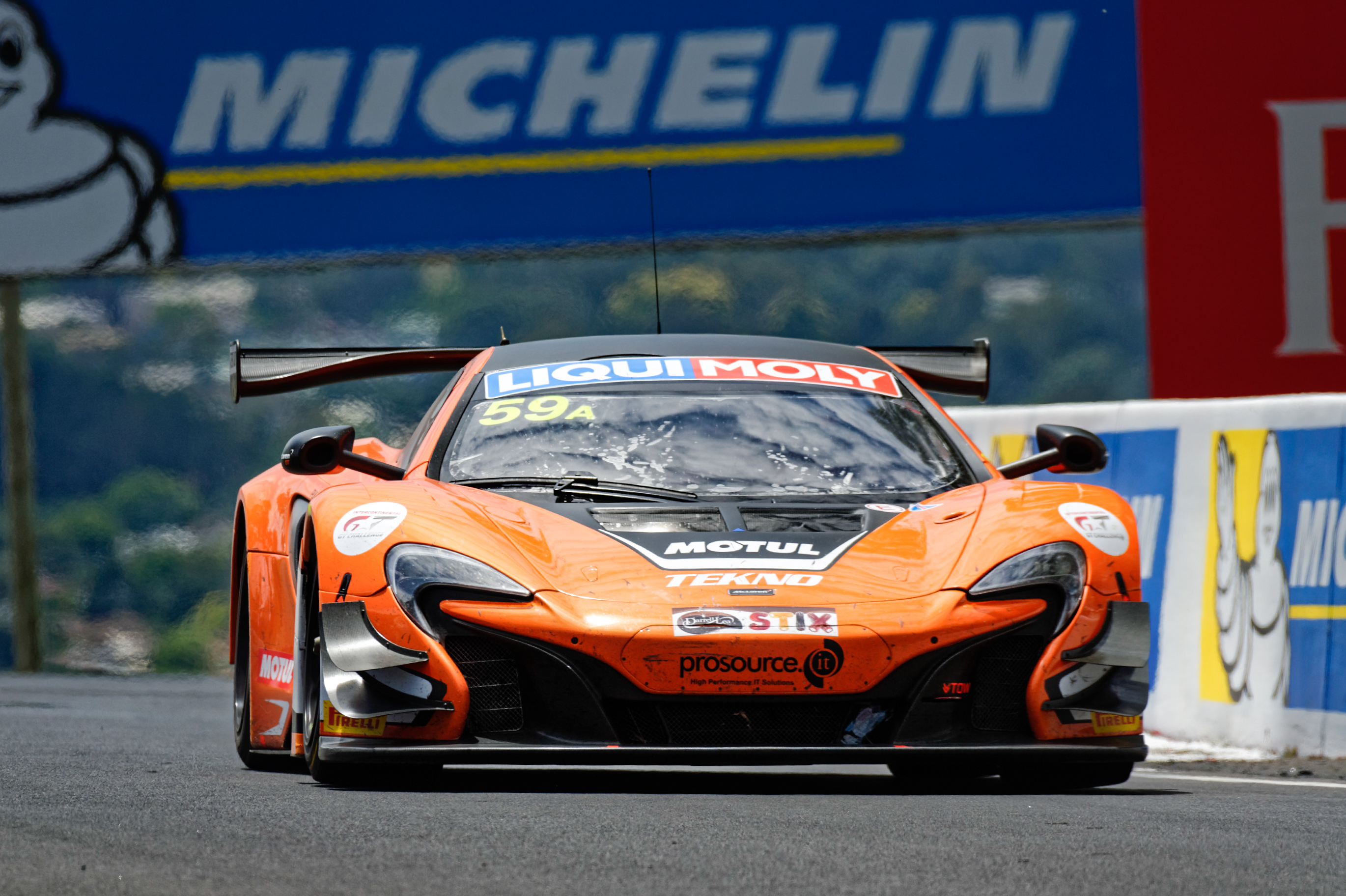
Shane van Gisbergen in the McLaren 650S GT3 which held the lap record from 2016 to 2018.

As of October 2026, the official lap record is held by Christopher Mies, who set a time of 1:59.2910 at the 2018 Challenge Bathurst event driving an unrestricted Audi R8 LMS. The fastest race lap is held by James Golding, who set a time of 1:59.8375 during the 2021 Bathurst 1000 event on 2 December 2021, driving a Rogers AF01/V8. The fastest lap on the original circuit layout was a 2:09.7 set by Formula 5000 driver Niel Allen in 1970, driving a McLaren M10B-Chevrolet.

Faster laps have been recorded at Mount Panorama but are not recognised as lap records as they were not set during an officially sanctioned session. As part of publicity for the 2011 Australian Grand Prix, McLaren provided a MP4-23 Formula One car for Jenson Button and Craig Lowndes. Button recorded a time of 1:48.88. During a demonstration at the 2019 Bathurst 12 Hour, Luke Youlden recorded a lap time of 1:58.694 in a Brabham BT62. A day before the 2024 Bathurst 12 Hour, Jules Gounon bettered this by over two seconds, setting a 1:56.6054 in an unrestricted Mercedes-AMG GT3. On 25 February 2024, merely a week after Gounon's effort, Romain Dumas set a 1:56.3247 in the electric Ford SuperVan 4.2, unofficially the fastest time ever recorded by a closed car at the track.

Kevin Bartlett set the first ever 100 mph (160 km/h) lap of the Mount Panorama Circuit at the Easter meeting in 1967 driving a Coventry Climax powered Repco Brabham BT11A, recording a 2:17.7 lap. For his achievement he was awarded 25 bottles of champagne. Later in the weekend he won the NSW State Road Racing Championship and lowered his lap record to 2:17.4, which earned him another 100 bottles. With a time of 2:17.8, Allan Grice set the first 160 km/h (100 mph) lap of the circuit for a touring car (under Group C regulations) during qualifying for the 1982 James Hardie 1000 driving a V8 powered Holden VH Commodore SS. Four years later at the 1986 James Hardie 1000, Grice also set the first 100 mph lap in a Group A touring car driving a Holden VK Commodore SS Group A, recording a 2:16.16 in official qualifying.

As of October 2026, the fastest official race lap records at Mount Panorama Circuit are listed as:

Category	Time	Driver	Vehicle	Date
Full Circuit (1987–present): 6.213 km (3.861 mi)
GT3 (unrestricted)	1:59.2910	(Germany) Christopher Mies	Audi R8 LMS	16 November 2018
S5000	1:59.8375	(Australia) James Golding	Rogers AF01/V8	2 December 2021
GT3	2:01.5670	(New Zealand) Shane van Gisbergen	McLaren 650S GT3	7 February 2016
Formula Three	2:02.6701	(Australia) Simon Hodge	Mygale M11	20 April 2014
Production Sports	2:03.419	(Denmark) Benny Simonsen	Ferrari 488 GT3	27 March 2016
Sports Sedan	2:03.6473	(Australia) Jordan Caruso	Audi A4	7 October 2023
Supercars Championship	2:04.7602	(Australia) Chaz Mostert	Ford Mustang GT	13 October 2019
Porsche Carrera Cup	2:05.4074	(United Kingdom) Harry King	Porsche 911 (992 I) GT3 Cup	8 October 2023
Radical Cup	2:06.5982	(Australia) Neale Muston	Radical SR8	4 April 2021
Super2 Series	2:06.7352	(Australia) Paul Dumbrell	Holden Commodore VE2	10 October 2015
Group CN	2:07.1295	(Australia) John-Paul Drake	Wolf GB08 Mistral	12 November 2022
Ferrari Challenge	2:07.4864	(Australia) Rick Armstrong	Ferrari 296 Challenge	14 February 2026
Trans-Am Australia	2:10.5053	(Australia) Aaron Seton	Ford Mustang Trans Am	3 April 2021
TCR Touring Car	2.13.9023	(Australia) Bailey Sweeny	Hyundai i30 N TCR	17 April 2022
Group 3A Touring Car	2:14.1458	(Australia) Dick Johnson	Ford Falcon (EB)	2 October 1994
GT4	2:14.2385	(Australia) Lochie Dalton	Mercedes-AMG GT4	10 November 2024
Nations Cup	2:14.3267	(Australia) Garth Tander	Holden Monaro 427C	17 November 2002
Group A Touring Car (3001cc and Over)	2:14.50	(Australia) Mark Skaife	Nissan Skyline GT-R R32	6 October 1991
Touring Car Masters	2:14.7197	(Australia) Steven Johnson	Ford Mustang Trans-Am	11 October 2026
Formula Xtreme	2:15.45	(Australia) Kevin Curtain	Yamaha YZF-R1	23 April 2000
Superbike	2:15.83	(Australia) Kevin Curtain	Yamaha YZF-R1	23 April 2000
Super Touring	2:16.8034	(United Kingdom) Jason Plato	Renault Laguna	5 October 1997
Formula Ford	2:17.9144	(Australia) Anton De Pasquale	Mygale SJ08a	5 October 2012
Stock car racing	2:18.1027	(New Zealand) Jim Richards	Chevrolet Lumina	24 February 1996
Improved Production	2:18.1913	(Australia) Adam Poole	Holden Monaro	31 March 2024
Group 3E Series Production	2:21.5712	(Australia) Cameron Crick	BMW M2	10 November 2024
Formula Ford (1600)	2:24.1300	(Australia) Neil McFayden	Van Diemen RF94	11 October 2002
GT Production	2:24.6065	(Australia) Neil Crompton	Ferrari F355	14 November 1998
Group Nc	2:28.070	(Australia) Vince Macri	Chevrolet Camaro	27 March 2016
SuperUtes Series	2:28.2619	(Australia) Cody Brewczynski	Mazda BT-50	9 October 2026
Group Nb	2:29.3172	(Australia) Jamie Tilley	Ford Mustang	3 April 2021
Aussie Racing Cars	2:29.3418	(Australia) Kody Garland	ARC Mustang Yamaha	25 February 2024
Mini Challenge	2:30.2732	(Australia) Jason Bargwanna	Mini Cooper S	11 October 2008
Sidecar	2:30.28	(Australia) G. Biggs/ (Australia) L. Genova	LCR Krauser	10 April 1993
Commodore Cup	2:30.7639	(Australia) Steve Owen	Holden VS Commodore	24 April 2011
V8 Ute Racing Series	2:31.1318	(Australia) Kris Walton	Ford FG Falcon XR8 Ute	12 October 2014
Group Sc	2:32.9968	(Australia) Geoff Morgan	Porsche 911 Carrera 2.7	3 February 2018
Saloon Cars	2:33.7123	(Australia) Brad Vaughan	Holden VT Commodore	5 April 2026
GR Cup	2:34.3173	(Australia) Will Thompson	Toyota GR86	11 October 2026
Group A Touring Car (Up to 1600cc)	2:34.32	(New Zealand) John Faulkner	Toyota Corolla FX-GT	30 September 1990
Group Sb	2:40.8391	(Australia) Terry Lawlor	Shelby GT350	2 February 2018
Nissan Pulsar	2:42.9216	(Australia) Joshua Craig	Nissan Pulsar (N14)	8 April 2023
Formula Vee (1600)	2:43.2401	(Australia) Benjamin Porter	Checkmate JP02 Volkswagen	5 February 2012
Group Sa	2:48.837	(Australia) Brian Duffy	Austin-Healey 3000 MkI	26 March 2016
Circuit Excels	2:50.9713	(Australia) Tyler Collins	Hyundai X3 Excel	20 April 2025
Formula Vee (1200)	2.55.7162	(Australia) Paul Sherman	Spectre Volkswagen	21 February 2009
HQ Holden	2:56.0330	(Australia) Peter Holmes	HQ Holden	19 October 1997
Group Na	3:21.3310	(Australia) K. Smith	MG ZA Magnette	11 April 2009
Original Circuit (1938–1986): 6.172 km (3.835 mi)
Formula 5000	2:09.7	(Australia) Niel Allen	McLaren M10B	30 March 1970
Group C Touring Car	2:15.13	(Australia) Peter Brock	Holden VK Commodore SS	30 September 1984
Group A Touring Car (Over 3000cc)	2:18.99	(Australia) Allan Grice	Holden VK Commodore SS Group A	5 October 1986
Group A Touring Car (2001 – 3000cc)	2:19.58	(Australia) Gary Scott	Nissan Skyline DR30 RS	5 October 1986
Group C Improved Production Touring Cars	2:22.4	(Canada) Allan Moffat	Ford Boss 302 Mustang	3 April 1972
Formula Libre	2:25.7	(New Zealand) Jim Palmer	Repco Brabham	27 March 1967
Group A Touring Car (Up to 2000cc)	2:30.78	(Australia) Bruce Stewart	Nissan Gazelle	5 October 1986
Group E Series Production	2:36.5	(Canada) Allan Moffat	Ford Falcon XY GTHO Phase III	1 October 1972

== Notable races ==
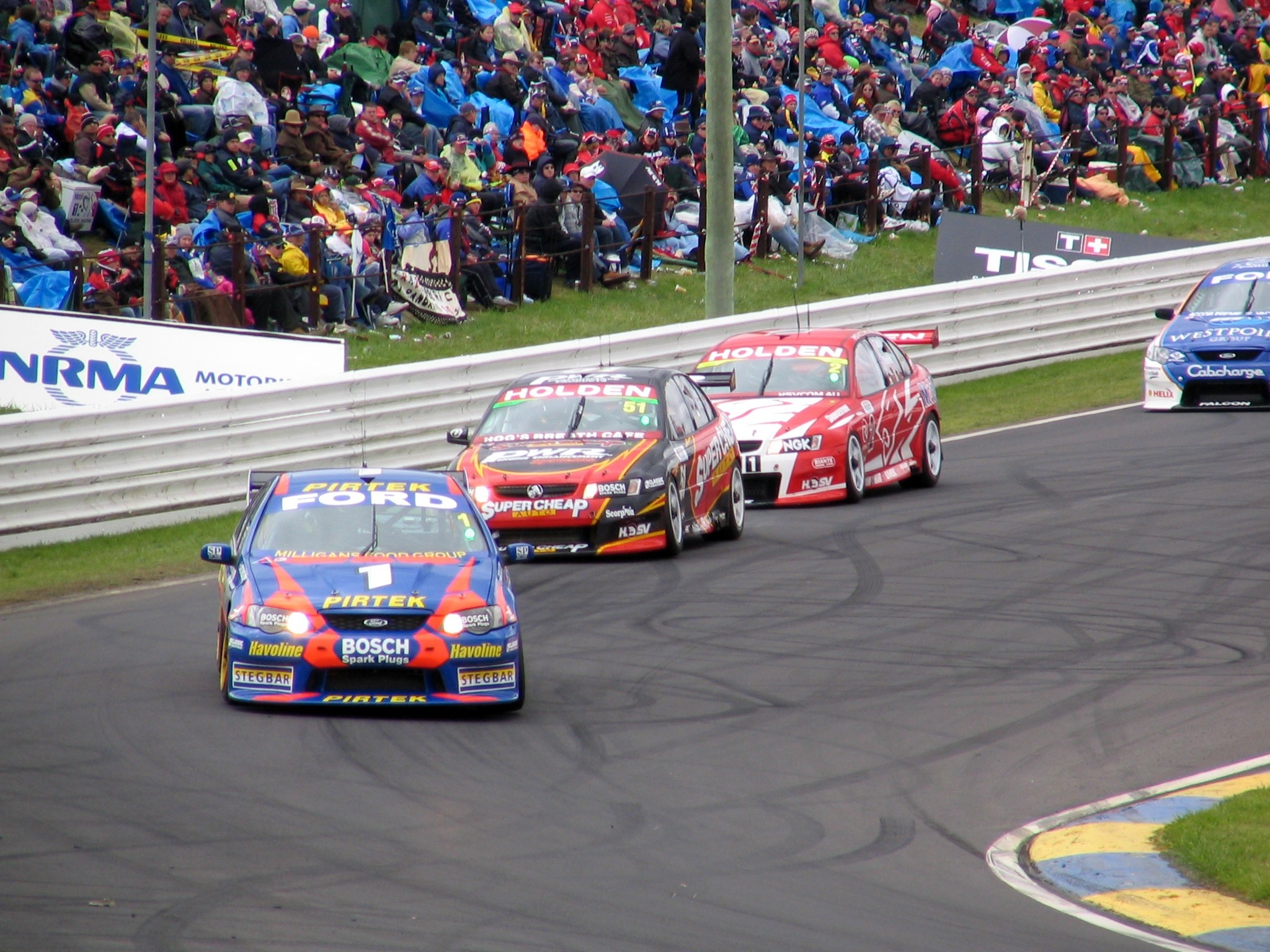
Cars on track during the 2005 Bathurst 1000

=== Motorcycles ===
The inaugural race held at the Mount Panorama Circuit was the 1938 Junior Tourist Trophy for motorcycles. The motorcycle event was held annually on Easter, with featured classes along the years including Unlimited (1300cc), Grand Prix, Battle of the Twins and Production as well as sidecars. Nine editions were held as the Australian motorcycle Grand Prix, all of them in the era before the event became part of the Grand Prix World Championship. From 1979 to 1988, the event featured the Arai 500, a 500 km race. The event was cancelled after the 1994 edition due to excessive risk to riders and small crowds. A revival event was held in 2000 but was unsuccessful.

=== Australian Grand Prix ===
The Australian Grand Prix was held at the circuit in 1938, 1947, 1952 and 1958. The 1938 race was the first major event held at the circuit after opening. The circuit also hosted the first post-World War II Australian Grand Prix in 1947, with the event then rotating between Australian states before returning in 1952 and 1958.

==== Winners ====
Year	Driver	Constructor	Report
1938	(United Kingdom) Peter Whitehead	ERA	Report
1947	(Australia) Bill Murray	MG	Report
1952	(Australia) Doug Whiteford	Talbot-Lago	Report
1958	(Australia) Lex Davison	Ferrari	Report

=== Bathurst 1000 ===
The circuit has been home to one of the world's classic endurance events, the Bathurst 1000, since 1963. This was the continuation of the event which began in 1960 at the Phillip Island Grand Prix Circuit in Victoria. The race was 500 miles between its start at Phillip Island in 1960, and from 1963 to 1972 at Bathurst, before being changed to its current 1000 km format in 1973. Since 1999, the Bathurst 1000 has also become a round of the V8 Supercars (formerly Australian Touring Car Championship) calendar.

=== ATCC sprint rounds ===
In addition to the Bathurst 1000, the circuit has hosted seven sprint rounds of the ATCC; in 1966, 1969, 1970, 1972, 1995, 1996, and 2021. The 1972 round has been considered one of the greatest races in championship history due to the close battle between Ian Geoghegan's Ford XY Falcon GTHO Phase III and Allan Moffat's Ford Boss 302 Mustang.

=== Endurance events ===
In more recent years, the circuit has also hosted longer endurance races including the Bathurst 24 Hour (2003–2004) and the Bathurst 12 Hour (1991–1994, 2007–2020, 2022–present) Since 2011, the Bathurst 12 Hour has become a FIA GT3 race, and became a part of the inaugural Intercontinental GT Challenge in 2016. The other major event currently held at the circuit is the Bathurst 6 Hour at Easter.

=== Other events ===
The first motorsport event was a speed hillclimb held from Mountain Straight up to Reid Park. This event is still held today as a round of the New South Wales Hillclimb Championship.

In 2008, the circuit hosted the IGSA Gravity Sports World Championships: skateboard downhill and street luge downhill. The race began at Skyline and ended at Conrod Straight.

Challenge Bathurst is a time attack and track day held since 2016.

== Event list ==
Current

- February: Intercontinental GT Challenge Bathurst 12 Hour, Ferrari Challenge Australasia
- April: Bathurst 6 Hour, Australian National Trans-Am Series, TA2 Racing Muscle Car Series, Aussie Racing Cars
- October: Supercars Championship Bathurst 1000, Super2 Series, SuperUtes Series, Touring Car Masters, Porsche Carrera Cup Australia Championship, GR Cup
- November: Challenge Bathurst

Future

- GT World Challenge Australia (1960, 2006–2007, 2009–2011, 2013, 2019–2024, 2027)
- GT4 Australia Series (2023–2024, 2027)

Former

- 24H Series (2013)
- Australian Drivers' Championship
  - Bathurst 100 (1940–1969)
- Australian Formula 3 Championship (2012–2014)
- Australian Formula Ford Championship (1995–1996, 2012, 2024)
- Australian Grand Prix (1938, 1947, 1952, 1958)
- Australian Mini Challenge (2008)
- Australian motorcycle Grand Prix (1940, 1946, 1952, 1966–1968, 1978, 1983, 1986, 1988)
- Australian Nations Cup Championship (2000)
- Australian One and a Half Litre Championship (1965, 1968)
- Australian Production Car Series (2007, 2010, 2017, 2022–2024)
- Australian Suzuki Swift Series (1995, 2014–2015)
- Australian Tourist Trophy (1958, 1961)
- Bathurst 24 Hour (2002–2003)
- National Sports Sedan Series (1992, 2023–2024)
- Porsche Sprint Challenge Australia (2009–2010, 2022–2023)
- S5000 Tasman Series (2021)
- Supercars Championship
  - Bathurst 500 (1966, 1969–1970, 1972, 1995–1996, 2021, 2024)
- TCR Australia Touring Car Series
  - Supercheap Auto Bathurst International (2021–2024)
- TCR World Tour (2023)
- V8 Ute Racing Series (2008–2017)
- World Athletics Cross Country Championships (2023)
- World Touring Car Championship
  - James Hardie 1000 (1987)

== Racing deaths at Mount Panorama ==
Sixteen competitors have died during racing associated with Mount Panorama, including 1967 World Drivers' Champion Denny Hulme who died after suffering a fatal heart attack while at the wheel of his car. Two spectators were also killed in 1955 after being struck by a crashing car.

- 17 April 1949 Jack Johnson, MG TC, Easter races
- 6 April 1953 Billy Raymond Baldry Motorcycle race, Easter races
- 5 April 1958 Barry Halliday, Motorcycle, Bathurst Tourist Trophy
- 2 October 1960 Reg Smith, Porsche, Australian GT Championship
- 7 April 1969 Bevan Gibson, Elfin 400 Repco, Mount Panorama Trophy
- 30 March 1970 Tom Sulman, Lotus Eleven Climax, Sir Joseph Banks Trophy
- 2 April 1972 Lan Hog, sidecar, Bathurst tt race
- 17 April 1976 Ross Barelli, Suzuki RG500, Easter races
- 15 April 1979 Ron Toombs, Yamaha TZ 350F, Easter races
- 4 April 1980 Alec Dick, Easter motorcycle races
- 6 April 1980 Rob Moorhouse, Easter motorcycle races
- 5 October 1986 Mike Burgmann, Holden Commodore VK SS Group A, James Hardie 1000
- 4 October 1992 Denny Hulme, BMW M3 Evolution, Tooheys 1000
- 2 April 1994 Jim Colligan, Sidecar, Australian Tourist Trophy
- 2 April 1994 Ian Thornton, Sidecar, Australian Tourist Trophy
- 30 September 1994 Don Watson, Holden Commodore VP, Tooheys 1000
- 8 October 2006 Mark Porter, Holden Commodore VZ, Fujitsu V8 Supercar Series

== Bibliography ==
- Smailes, John (2023). Mount Panorama: Bathurst – The Stories Behind the Legend. Crows Nest, NSW: Allen & Unwin. ISBN 978-1-76147-032-5.
