= Henry Herbert Collier =

British motorcycle designer

- Born: 1859; Birkenhead, Merseyside
- Died: 1926 (aged 66–67)
- Occupations: Motorcycle designer and manufacturer
- Children: 1. Harry; 2. Charles Richard Collier (1885–1954); 3. Bert

Henry Herbert Collier (1859–1926) was one of the first British motorcycle designers, inventor and founder of the Matchless Motorcycle Company.

== Early life ==
Collier was born in Birkenhead, Merseyside, England in 1859

== Business ==
Henry Collier founded a company to make bicycles under the Matchless name in Herbert Road, Plumstead in 1878. When his two eldest sons Henry (known as Harry) and Charlie joined him in the business it became 'H Collier & Sons'. Their competitors were experimenting with adding engines to their bicycles, so the Colliers tried a small motor over the front wheel, then moved it to under the front down tube, then finally into the traditional diamond-shaped frame. Using De Dion and Puteaux engines, the Colliers added one of the first pillion seats in 1903 and chain drive in 1905.

The Colliers also decided to enter their machines in the new Isle of Man TT and the first TT race in 1907 was won by Collier's son Charles on a 432cc Matchless Charlie with an average speed of 38.21 mph and a time of 4 hours 8 minutes 8 seconds. Harry did not finish in 1907, but won in 1909, and Charlie won again in 1910, bringing Matchless motorcycles to the attention of the public.. Collier's other son Harry won the Isle of Man TT in 1909. Both brothers were also successful at Brooklands.

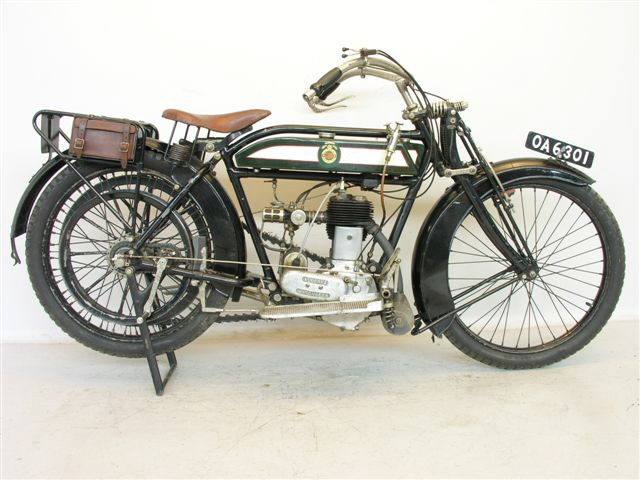
1914 Matchless 557 cc

They produced a JAP V-twin powered bike in 1905 which boasted one of the earliest swing-arm rear suspensions, coupled with leading-link front forks. Matchless made mostly singles, but they also made V-twins from 496 cc to 998 cc. They made their own engines from 1912 on.

Matchless was not given a contract to make motorcycles for the army during the First World War. Peacetime production resumed in 1919, concentrating at first on V-twins for sidecar use, leaving singles until 1923.

When Henry Collier died in 1926 the company he started went on to become one of the most successful British motorcycle marques.

== See also ==
- Matchless
