= 1925 Isle of Man TT =

Annual motorcycle racing event

1925 Isle of Man Tourist Trophy
- Date: June 15, 17 and 19, 1925
- Location: Douglas, Isle of Man
- Course: Snaefell Mountain Course; 37.739 miles (60.74 km).
- Organiser: Auto-Cycle Union
- Clerk: T.W. Loughborough

Junior TT
- First: Wal Handley, Rex-Acme
- Second: Howard R. Davies, HRD
- Third: Jimmy Simpson, AJS

Fastest lap
- Wal Handley; 34min. 23sec. 65.89 mph New record

Ultra Lightweight TT
- First: Wal Handley, Rex-Acme
- Second: Paddy Johnston, Cotton
- Third: Jock Porter, New Gerrard

Fastest lap
- Wal Handley; 41min. 52sec. 54.12 mph New record

Senior TT
- First: Howard R. Davies, HRD
- Second: Frank Longman, AJS
- Third: Alec Bennett, Norton

Fastest lap
- Jimmy Simpson; 32min. 50sec. 68.97 mph New record

Lightweight TT
- First: Edwin Tremlow, New Imperial
- Second: Paddy Johnston, Cotton
- Third: Kenneth Tremlow, New Imperial

Fastest lap
- Wal Handley; 37min. 36sec. 60.22 mph New record

Sidecar TT
- First: Leonard Parker, Douglas; Ken Horstmann
- Second: Bert Taylor, Norton; C.R. Hirst
- Third: George Grinton, Norton; Arthur Kinrade

Fastest lap
- Freddie Dixon; 39min. 36sec. 57.18 mph New record

The 1925 Isle of Man Tourist Trophy was the second and final year of the Ultra-Lightweight class for motorcycles of 175 cc capacity. This was the third year of the Sidecar race, which was also dropped after 1925.

After numerous retirements in 1924, Wal Handley won the Junior TT race over six laps of the Mountain Course on a Rex-Acme motorcycle at an average speed of 65.02 mph (104.64 km/h). Later in the week, Handley became the first TT rider to win two races in a week when he won the four-lap Ultra-Lightweight TT race, again on a Rex-Acme, setting a race record average speed of 53.45 mph (86.02 km/h), and a new lap record of 41 minutes, 52 seconds at an average speed of 54.12 mph (87.10 km/h).

During the Lightweight TT race, Wal Handley led the first two laps by over two minutes from C. W. "Paddy" Johnston, riding a Cotton, but a puncture caused Handley to slip off his motorcycle at Signpost Corner. The race was eventually won by Eddie Twemlow on a New Imperial at an average speed of 57.74 mph (92.92 km/h) from Johnston and Eddie's brother, Ken Twemlow, riding a New Imperial. The Senior TT race was sensationally won by Howard Davis while competing against the works teams with a motorcycle of his own manufacture, an HRD, in 3 hours, 25 minutes, 8 seconds at an average speed of 66.13 mph (106.43 km/h). A new lap record was posted by Jimmie Simpson, in 32 minutes and 50 seconds and an average speed of 68.97 mph (111.00 km/h) on an AJS motorcycle, but he failed to finish.

== Ultra-Lightweight 175 cc Race ==
Rank	Rider	Team	Time	Speed	Laps
1	(United Kingdom) Wal Handley	Rex-Acme	2.49.27.0	53.45	4
2	(Republic of Ireland) C. W. Johnston	Cotton	2.55.54.0	52.08	
3	(United Kingdom) Jock Porter	New Gerrard	2.57.40.0	50.98	

== Junior 350 cc Race ==
Rank	Rider	Team	Time	Speed	Laps
1	(United Kingdom) Wal Handley	Rex-Acme	3.28.56.4	65.02 mph	6
2	(United Kingdom) Howard R. Davies	HRD	3.32.42.0	63.87	
3	(United Kingdom) Jimmie Simpson	AJS	3.39.20.0	61.89	

== Senior 500 cc Race ==
Rank	Rider	Team	Time	Speed	Laps
1	(United Kingdom) Howard R. Davies	HRD	3.25.25.8	66.13 mph (106.43 km/h)	6
2	(United Kingdom) Frank Longman	AJS	3.29.10.0	64.95	
3	(United Kingdom) Alec Bennett	Norton	3.30.08.0	64.05	

== Lightweight TT ==
It was held on Wednesday, June 19, 1925, at 9:30 am over a distance of 226 miles and 750 yards, 6 laps of 37.75 miles each. The machines were limited of cylinder capacity not exceeding 250cc. All nineteen entries started the race and only five riders finished.

The 14th International Isle of Man Tourist Trophy

Pos	#	Rider	Bike	Lightweight TT race classification			
Pos	#	Rider	Bike	Laps	Time	Speed	Prizes & Remarks
1	1	(United Kingdom) Edwin Tremlow	246cc New Imperial	6	3:55:18.00	57.74 mph	1st Prize - Winner of Lightweight Tourist Trophy, £20.
2	18	(Republic of Ireland) Paddy Johnston	249cc Cotton	6	3:58:51.00	56.88 mph	2nd Prize, £10.
3	2	(United Kingdom) Kenneth Tremlow	246cc New Imperial	6	4:03:19.00	55.83 mph	3rd Prize, £5.
4	6	(United Kingdom) Jack Cooke	249cc DOT	6	4:05:41.00	55.29 mph	Replica.
5	7	(United Kingdom) Doug Prentice	249cc P & P	6	4:27:39.00	50.78 mph	
DNF	12	(United Kingdom) Freddie Morgan	249cc Cotton	6	Still on the course but did not finish before the time laid down for the end of race at 1:20 pm. Broke valve spring on lap 1.		
DNF	13	(United Kingdom) Billy Lord	246cc Grindlay Peerless	6	Still on the course but did not finish before the time laid down for the end of race at 1:20 pm. Plug troubles during the race.		
DNF	19	(United Kingdom) Fred Craner	248cc Rex-Acme	6	Still on the course but did not finish before the time laid down for the end of race at 1:20 pm.		
DNF	11	(United Kingdom) Phil Pike	249cc Velocette	5	Retired on the last lap.		
DNF	15	(United Kingdom) Jimmy Hall	249cc P & P	5	Retired on the last lap.		
DNF	14	(United Kingdom) Harry Brockbank	249cc Cotton	4	Retired on lap 5 from third place.		
DNF	10	(Isle of Man) Mylie Sheard	248cc OEC-Blackburne	3	Retired on lap 4 at Hillberry with engine trouble.		
DNF	9	(United Kingdom) Len Horton	246cc New Imperial	3	Retired on lap 4 at Ballaugh with engine trouble.		
DNF	17	(United Kingdom) Wal Handley	248cc Rex-Acme	3	Retired at lap 3 while leading the race. His tyre burst approaching Governor's Bridge and he was thrown.		
DNF	3	(Scotland) Jock Porter	248cc New Gerrard	3	Retired at the end of lap 3 due to a seized rocker.		
DNF	4	(Republic of Ireland) Stanley Woods	248cc New Imperial	2	Retired on lap 3.		
DNF	16	(Northern Ireland) Norman Scott	246cc Levis	1	Crashed on lap 2 outside of Ramsey due to seized engine.		
DNF	8	(United Kingdom) Leonard Booth	248cc New Imperial	1	Retired on lap 2 at Creg-na-baa with a broken valve.		
DNF	5	(Scotland) A.J. Robertson	249cc AJR-JAP	0	Retired on first lap at Union Mills with plug trouble.		
DNS	9	(United Kingdom) Reg. Gray	246cc New Imperial		Was unable to start and Len Horton took over his entry.		
Fastest lap: Wal Handley, 37min. 36sec. 60.22 mph

== Sidecar TT ==
It was held on Friday, June 19, 1925, at 1:30pm over a distance of 151 miles and 680 yards, 4 laps of 37.75 miles each. Sidecar TT machines were limited of cylinder capacity not exceeding 600cc. All 18 entries started the race at one minute intervals and six finished.

The 14th International Isle of Man Tourist Trophy

Pos	#	Driver	Passenger	Bike	Sidecar TT race classification			
Pos	#	Driver	Passenger	Bike	Laps	Time	Speed	Prizes & Remarks
1	23	(United Kingdom) Leonard Parker	(United Kingdom) Ken Horstmann	596cc Douglas	4	2:44:01.80	55.22 mph	1st Prize - Winner of Sidecar Tourist Trophy, £20.
2	32	(United Kingdom) Bert Taylor	(United Kingdom) C.R. Hirst	588cc Norton	4	2:45:58.00	54.57 mph	Silver replica.
3	24	(Scotland) George Grinton	(Isle of Man) Arthur Kinrade	588cc Norton	4	2:46:45.00	53.31 mph	Silver replica.
4	38	(United Kingdom) Frank Longman	(United Kingdom) Leo Davenport	349cc AJS	4	2:59:10.00	50.55 mph	Silver replica. 1st in the 350cc class.
5	37	(United Kingdom) Jimmy Simpson	(United Kingdom) George Cowley, junr.	349cc AJS	4	3:01:53.00	49.79 mph	Silver replica. 2nd in the 350cc class.
6	27	(United Kingdom) Owen Bridcutt	(United Kingdom) S.E. Lewis	499cc Dunelt	4	3:03:34.00	49.34 mph	Silver replica.
DNF	31	(United Kingdom) Freddie Hatton	(United Kingdom) W.A. Willcox	596cc Douglas	3	Crashed on last lap at Kirk Michael due to broken forks.		
DNF	21	(United Kingdom) George Tucker	(United Kingdom) G. Hammond	588cc Norton	3	Retired on last lap at Laurel Bank with engine trouble.		
DNF	35	(United Kingdom) Harry Reed	(United Kingdom) Joe Hooson	346cc DOT	3	Retired at the end of lap 3, back brake not functioning.		
DNF	36	(United Kingdom) George Cowley, senr.	(Isle of Man) D. Cowley	348cc Sunbeam	2	Retired on lap 3.		
DNF	22	(United Kingdom) Freddie Dixon	(United Kingdom) Walter Denny	596cc Douglas	2	Retired on lap 3 while leading the race at Laurel Bank with engine trouble.		
DNF	33	(United Kingdom) Percy Brewster	(United Kingdom) D. Cocks	600cc P & P	2	Retired on lap 3 at Braddan.		
DNF	33	(Spain) Vincent Naure	(Spain) M. Canto	596cc Douglas	1	Retired on lap 2.		
DNF	26	(United Kingdom) Almond Tinkler	(United Kingdom) N. Tinkler	499cc P & M Panther	1	Retired on lap 2.		
DNF	29	(United Kingdom) Graham Walker	(Isle of Man) Tony Mahon	588cc Sunbeam	1	Retired on lap 2.		
DNF	28	(United Kingdom) L.P. Driscoll	(United Kingdom) C.W. Juggins	588cc Norton	0	Retired on first lap near Braddan Bridge due broken rocker-arm support.		
DNF	30	(United Kingdom) Bert Kershaw	(United Kingdom) W.M. Mowbray	594cc New Hudson	0	Retired on first lap at Ballaugh with seized engine.		
DNF	25	(United Kingdom) Harry Langman	(United Kingdom) Eric Mainwaring	596cc Scott	0	Retired on first lap at Lezayre with gear trouble.		
DNS	A	(United Kingdom) C.E. Wise		349cc AJS		Reserve.		
DNS	B	(United Kingdom) George Cowley, junr.		349cc AJS		Reserve.		
DNS	C	(United Kingdom) H. Town		596cc Scott		Reserve.		
DNS	D	(United Kingdom) Tom Bullus		499cc P & M Panther		Reserve.		
DNS	E	(United Kingdom) E. Millsom		Calthorpe		Reserve.		
DNS	F	(United Kingdom) P. Peterson	(Isle of Man) Norman Dawson	499cc Dunelt		Reserve.		
DNS	G	(United Kingdom) H. Glover		596cc Douglas		Reserve.		
Fastest lap: Freddie Dixon, 39min. 36sec. 57.18 mph
