= 1909 Isle of Man TT =

Annual motorcycle racing event

Isle of Man Tourist Trophy
- Date: September 23, 1909
- Location: St John's, Isle of Man
- Course: St John's Short Course; 15 miles, 1,470 yards (25.49 km)
- Organiser: Auto-Cycle Union, Tynwald
- Clerk: Freddie Straight

500 Single & 750 Twin Open Class
- First: Harry Collier, Matchless
- Second: Lee Evans, Indian
- Third: Billy Newsome, Triumph

Fastest lap
- Harry Collier; 18min. 05sec. 52.27 mph (New record)

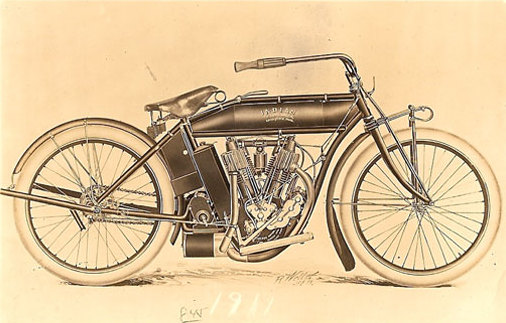
1909 5 hp (3.7 kW) Indian

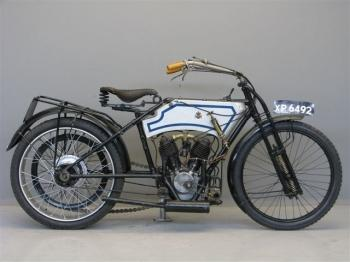
1909 5 1/2 hp (4.1 kW) Rex

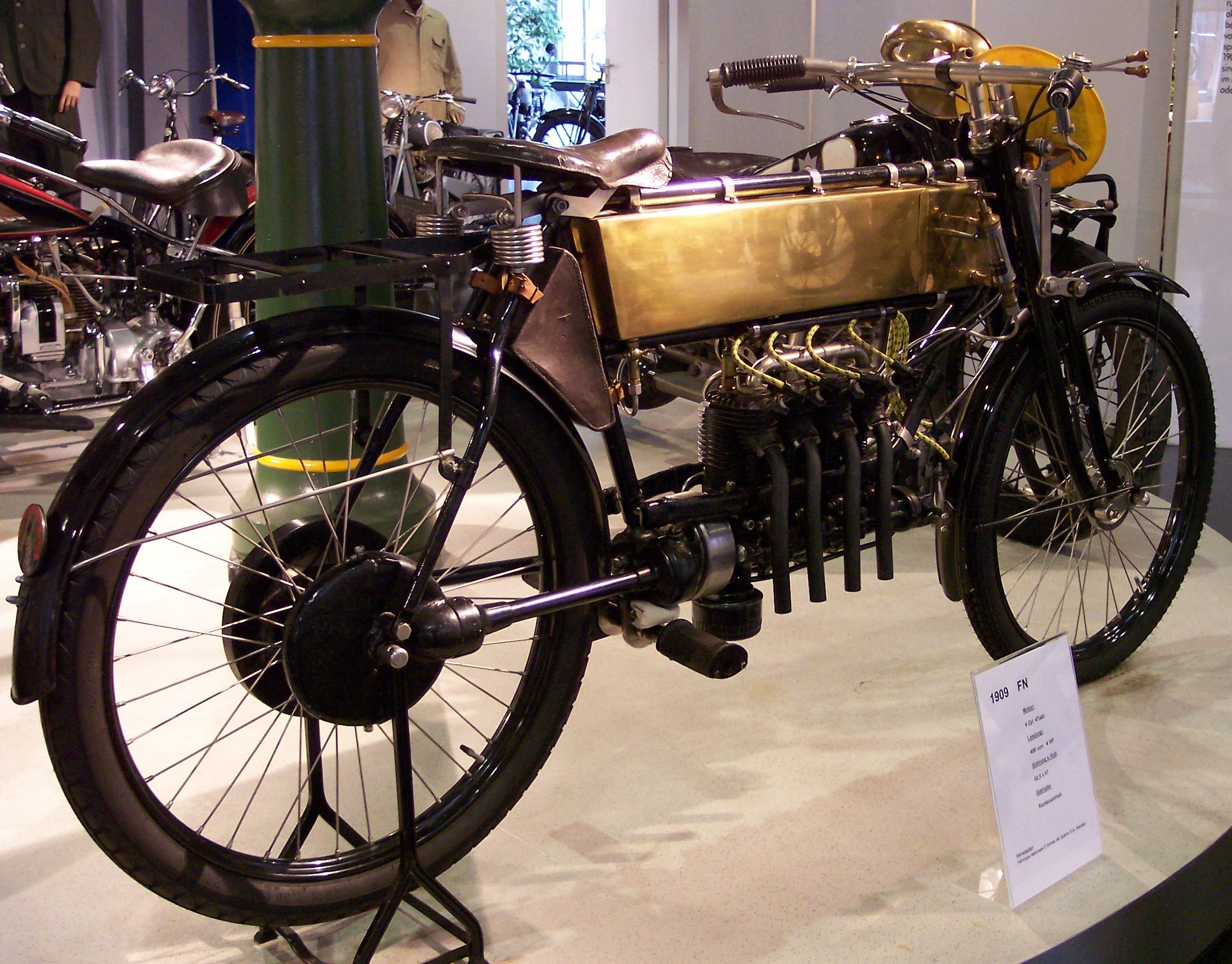
1909 Four-cylinder FN

The third Isle of Man Tourist Trophy motorcycle race was held on Thursday, September 23, 1909, at the St John's Short Course, Isle of Man. The race was ten laps of the 15-mile 1,430-yard course, a total race distance of 158.125 miles (254.478 km). There was no limit on fuel consumption and the singles and twins, limited to 500 and 750cc respectively, ran together. The men were sent off in pairs at half-minute intervals. Giosue Giuppone became the first Italian rider to finish the race in twelfth place on a new 84x86mm (476cc) Peugeot. Ernesto Gnesa had taken part of 1908 Isle of Man TT a year before, retiring on the first lap.

== 500 Single & 750 Twin Results Open Class Race ==
Thursday 23 September 1909 – 10 laps (158 1/8 miles, 254.5 km) St. John's Short Course.

(Isle of Man) The 3rd International Auto-cycle Tourist Trophy

Pos	#	Rider	Bike	Cyl.	500 Single & 750 Twin Open Class race classification			
Pos	#	Rider	Bike	Cyl.	Laps	Time	Speed	Prizes
1	18	(United Kingdom) Harry Collier	6 hp (4.5 kW) Matchless 738cc	2	10	3:13.37.8	49.01 mph	1st Prize - Trophy and £40
2	7	(United States) Lee Evans	5 hp (3.7 kW) Indian 714cc	2	10	3:17.35.2	48.07 mph	2nd Prize - £20.
3	45	(United Kingdom) Billy Newsome	3 1/2 hp (2.6 kW) Triumph 499cc	1	10	3:31.10.0	44.92 mph	3rd Prize - £10
4	11	(United Kingdom) Oliver Godfrey	3 1/2 hp (2.6 kW) Rex 499cc	1	10	3:31.31.6	44.89 mph	4th Prize - £5
5	5	(Republic of Ireland) Charles Franklin	3 1/2 hp (2.6 kW) Triumph 499cc	1	10	3:40.31.2	43.06 mph	Silver Cup and £5 5s for the 1st Private owners' machine.
6	10	(United Kingdom) Frank Applebee jun.	5 1/2 hp (4.1 kW) Rex 749cc	2	10	3:42.24.2	42.69 mph	
7	59	(United Kingdom) J. Munroe	5 hp (3.7 kW) BAT-JAP	2	10	3:46.15.2	41.88 mph	Silver Cup and £2 2s for the 2nd Private owners' machine.
8	34	(United Kingdom) Basil V. Jones	3 3/4 hp (2.8 kW) Premier 548cc	2	10	3:46.16.2	41.87 mph	
9	38	(United Kingdom) Arthur Moorhouse	5 hp (3.7 kW) Rex 749cc	2	10	3:46.54.6	41.54 mph	Gold medal presented by Rex Co. for the 1st Private owner on their machine.
10	19	(United Kingdom) Bert Colver	3 1/2 hp (2.6 kW) Matchless-JAP 482cc	1	10	3:55.08.6	40.36 mph	
11	46	(Isle of Man) Walter Creyton	3 1/2 hp (2.6 kW) Triumph 499cc	1	10	3:55.10.0	40.23 mph	
12	54	(Italy) Giosue Giuppone	3 1/2 hp (2.6 kW) Peugeot 476cc	1	10	3:57.49.0	39.95 mph	
13	55	(United Kingdom) John Lang	5 hp (3.7 kW) Tee-Bee-JAP	2	10	4:00.53.0	39.44 mph	
14	49	(United Kingdom) William McMinnies	3 1/2 hp (2.6 kW) Triumph 499cc	1	10	4:04.02.8	38.84 mph	
15	17	(Republic of Ireland) James Stewart	3 1/2 hp (2.6 kW) Triumph 499cc	1	10	4:10.45.5	37.88 mph	
16	39	(United Kingdom) Rem Fowler	5–6 hp (3.7–4.5 kW) Rex 749cc	2	10	4:15.47.6	37.14 mph	
17	40	(United Kingdom) Thomas Greer	5 hp (3.7 kW) Rex 749cc	2	10	4:25.59.6	34.93 mph	
18	25	(United Kingdom) Andrew Sproston	5 hp (3.7 kW) Rex 726cc	2	10	4:36.52.2	32.13 mph	
19	47	(United Kingdom) Percy Butler	5 hp (3.7 kW) Dot-Peugeot 662cc	2	10	4:58.50.0		
Fastest lap: Harry Collier, 18min. 05sec. 52.27 mph (New record)
