= Douglas Road Corner =

Coordinates: 54°16′51″N 4°35′16″W

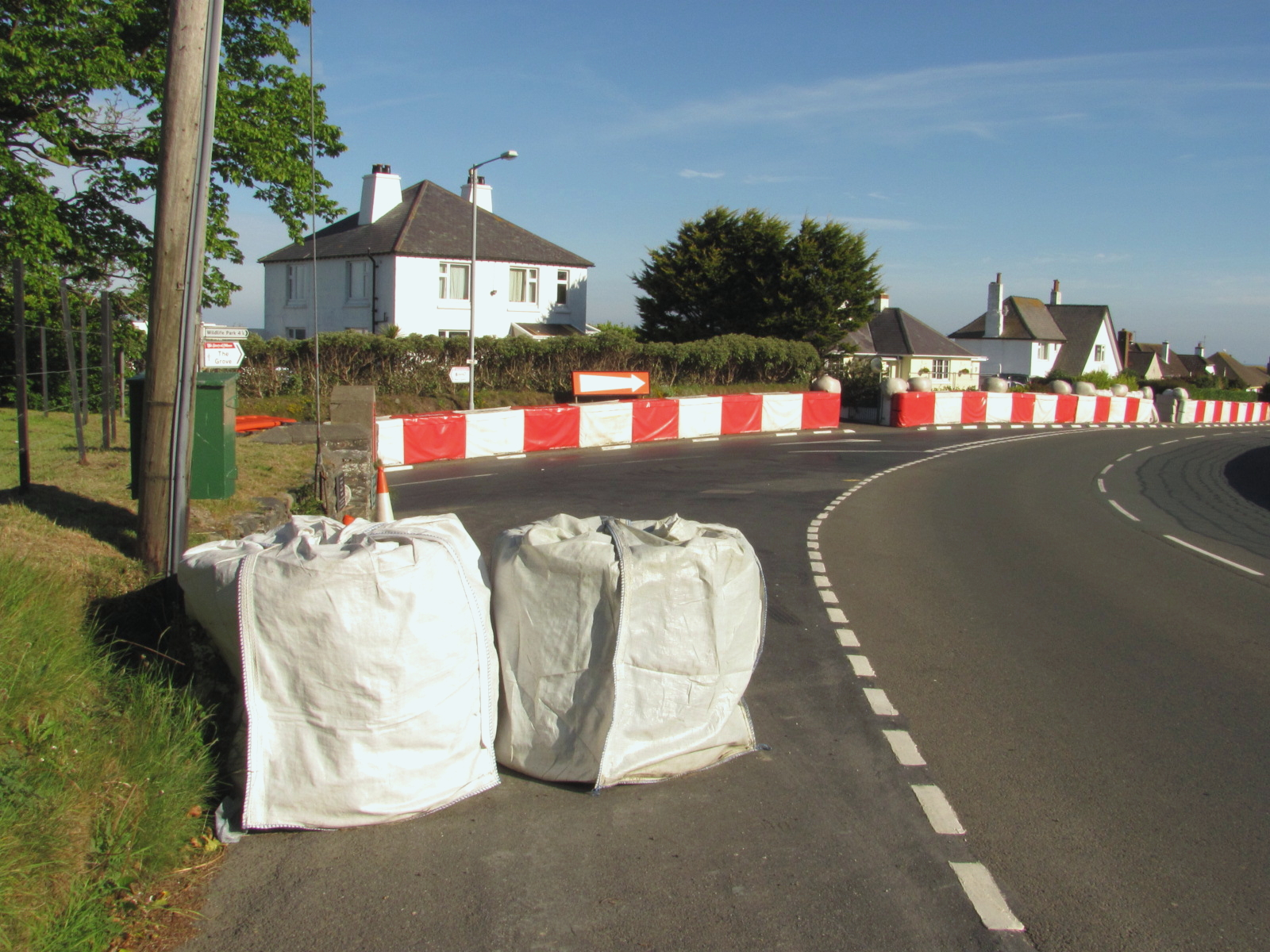
The A3 Castletown to Ramsey Road approaching Douglas Road Corner, Kirk Michael.

Douglas Road Corner (Manx: Cooilldarry – Oak Nook) or Kirk Michael Corner is situated adjacent the 14th Milestone road-side marker on the Snaefell Mountain Course on the primary A3 Castletown to Ramsey Road and the road junction with the A4 Peel to Kirk Michael Coast Road in the parish of Michael in the Isle of Man.

In 1879 the Manx Northern Railway built a narrow gauge railway from St.John's to Ramsey which ran parallel to the A3 and A4 roads from St. Germain's through Kirk Michael to Sulby Bridge. The railway line crossed a number of minor roads as it passed the Devil's Elbow, Ballacarnane Beg, Ballagawne and a 75 feet high railway viaduct at Glen Wyllin near to Kirk Michael.

The Douglas Road Corner in Kirk Michael was part of the Highroads Course used for the Gordon Bennett Trial in 1904 and the Tourist Trophy for automobiles in 1905. It was part of the Short Highland Course as part of the Peel Loop used for Tourist Trophy automobile car races held in the Isle of Man between 1906 and 1907. From 1908, Douglas Road Corner was part of the Four Inch Course used for automobile racing between 1908 and 1922. The name of the course derives from the regulations for the 1908 Tourist Trophy adopted by the Royal Automobile Club which limited the engines of the competing automobiles to a cylinder diameter of four-inches. The Four-Inch Course was adopted by the Auto-Cycle Club for the 1911 Isle of Man TT Races. The Four-Inch Course was subsequently known as the Snaefell Mountain Course or Mountain Course when used for motor-cycle racing.

It was also part of the 15 miles 1,470 yards St. John's Short Course used for motor-cycle racing for the Isle of Man TT Races between 1907 and 1910. The Douglas Road Corner was situated between the 6th milestone and 7th milestone on the St. John's Short Course, 345 ft above sea level. Also, Douglas Road Corner is part of the Snaefell Mountain Course used since 1911 for the Isle of Man TT and from 1923 for the Manx Grand Prix Races.

== Gallery ==
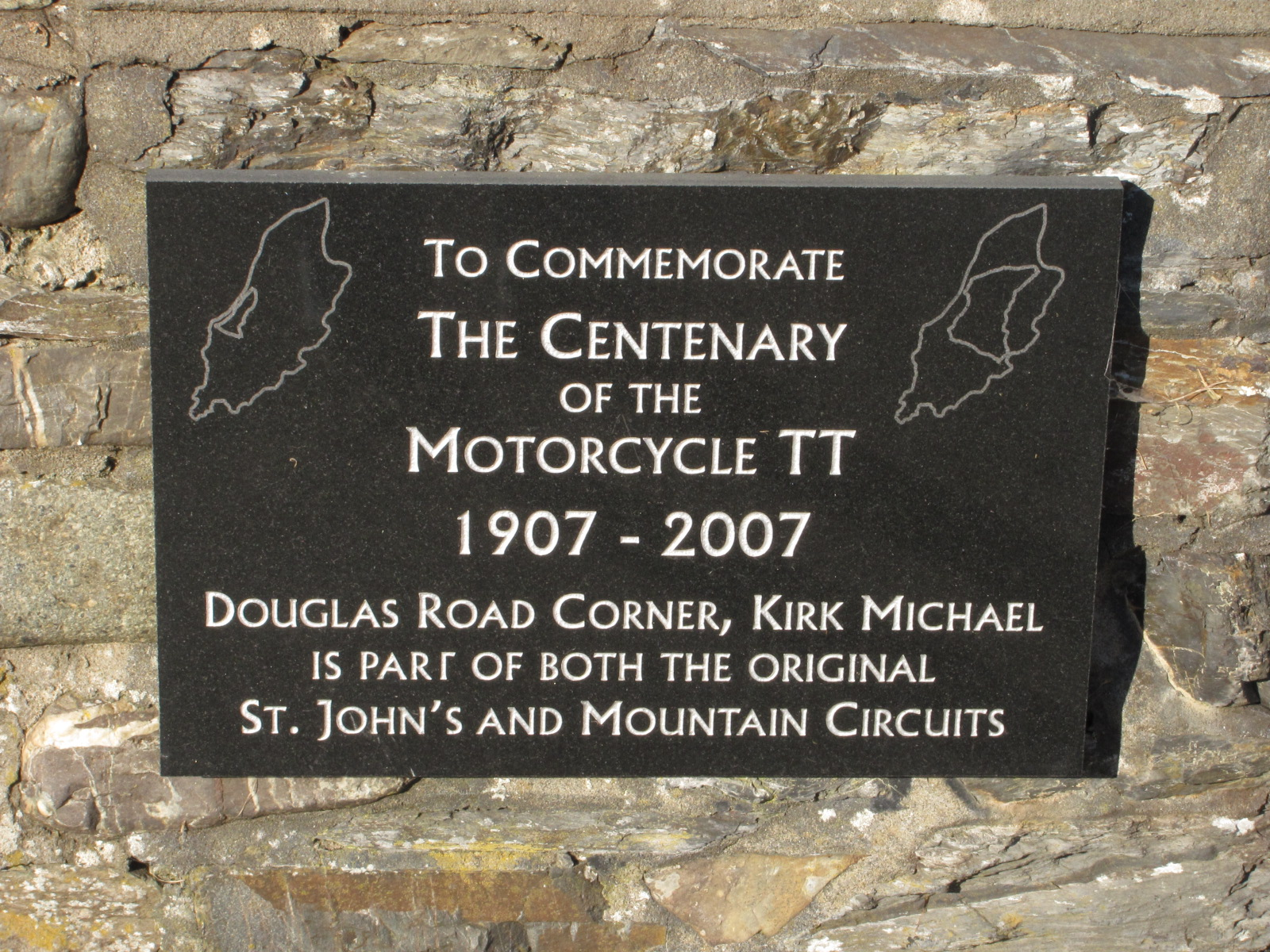
Road Side Commemorative Plaque A3 Castletown to Ramsey Douglas Road Corner, Kirk Michael.
