= 1908 Isle of Man TT =

Annual motorcycle racing event

Isle of Man Tourist Trophy
- Date: 22 September 1908
- Location: St John's, Isle of Man
- Course: St John's Short Course; 15 miles, 1,470 yards (25.49 km)
- Organiser: Auto-Cycle Union
- Clerk: Freddie Straight

Single Cylinder class
- First: Jack Marshall, Triumph
- Second: Charlie Collier, Matchless-JAP
- Third: Capt Sir Robert Arbuthnot, Triumph

Fastest lap
- Jack Marshall; 22min. 20sec. 42.50 mph (New record)

Twin Cylinder class
- First: H Reed, DOT-Peugeot
- Second: W.H. Bashall, BAT-JAP
- Third: R.O. Clark, FN

Fastest lap
- Harry Bashall; 22min. 27sec. 42.28 mph (New record)

The second Isle of Man Tourist Trophy motorcycle race was held on 22 September 1908 on the St John's Short Course, Isle of Man.

== 1908 The International Motorcycle Tourist Trophy ==
Tuesday 22 September 1908 – 10 laps (approx 158 ¼ miles) St. John's Short Course.

(Isle of Man) The 2nd International Motorcycle Tourist Trophy

Pos	#	Rider	Bike	Single Cylinder race classification			
Pos	#	Rider	Bike	Laps	Time	Speed	Prizes
1	5	(United Kingdom) Jack Marshall	3½ hp Triumph	10	3:54.50.0	40.40 mph	1st Prize - Trophy and £25
2	1	(United Kingdom) Charlie Collier	3½ hp Matchless-JAP	10	3:57.06.8	40.01 mph	2nd Prize - £15.
3	24	(United Kingdom) Capt Sir Robert Arbuthnot	3½ hp Triumph	10	4:07.57.0	38.26 mph	3rd Prize - £10
4	6	(United Kingdom) Billy Newsome	3½ hp Triumph	10	4:12.09.4	37.63 mph	
5	21	(United Kingdom) William McMinnies	3½ hp Triumph	10	4:22.25.8	36.60 mph	
6	15	(Republic of Ireland) Charles Franklin	3½ hp Chater-Lea	10	4:30.32.8	35.07 mph	
7	22	(United Kingdom) Lt-Col Howard Lister-Cooper	3½ hp Triumph	10	4:33.46.8	34.65 mph	
8	30	(United Kingdom) Oliver Godfrey	3½hp Rex	10	4:33.54.2	34.64 mph	
9	17	(United Kingdom) Rupert Brice	3½ hp Brown	10	4:49.58.2	33.89 mph	
10	12	(United Kingdom) Gordon Gibson	3½ hp Triumph	10	5:19.05	29.50 mph	
DNF	7	(United Kingdom) Jack Slaughter	3½ hp Triumph	7	Retired on lap 8 due to broken exhaust valve.		
DNF	34	(United Kingdom) Bob Bell	3½hp Two-speed NSU	5	Had several punctures and a fall		
DNF	27	(United Kingdom) Frank Barker	3½hp Rex	3	Retired on lap 4 due to broken crankshaft.		
DNF	10	(United Kingdom) Robert Ellis	3½hp Rex	1	Retired on lap 2 due to broken petrol pipe.		
DNF	3	(United Kingdom) Harry Collier	3½ hp Matchless-JAP	0	Retired on lap 1.		
Fastest lap: Jack Marshall, 22min. 20sec. 42.48 mph (New record)

Pos	#	Rider	Bike	Twin Cylinder race classification			
Pos	#	Rider	Bike	Laps	Time	Speed	Prizes
1	26	(United Kingdom) Harry Reed	5 hp DOT-Peugeot	10	4:05.58.0	38.57 mph	1st Prize - Trophy and £25.
2	11	(United Kingdom) Harry Bashall	6-7 hp BAT-JAP	10	4:08.15.0	38.22 mph	2nd Prize - £15
3	32	(United Kingdom) Ronald Clark	5 hp Four-cylinder FN	10	4:11.02.8	37.79 mph	3rd Prize - £10
4	9	(United States) Billy Wells	5 hp Vindec Special	10	4:15.12.2	37.18 mph	Ran out of petrol in Peel and was able to coax his machine to finish
5	37	(United Kingdom) John Lang	6 hp NSU	10	4:15.12.2	37.18 mph	
6	14	(Republic of Ireland) Noel Drury	6 hp Matchless-JAP	10	4:25.56.2	36.68 mph	
7	20	(United Kingdom) Arthur Moorhouse	5 hp Rex	10	4:45.57.8	33.24 mph	Ran out of petrol and pushed six miles to finish
8	36	(United Kingdom) J.O.M. Dixon	5 hp Vindec Special	10	4:46.57.8	33.06 mph	
9	4	(United Kingdom) Bert Colver	7 hp Matchless-JAP	10	4:52.33.2	32.43 mph	
10	16	(United Kingdom) S.C. Berryman	5 hp Norton	10	5:12.21	30.50 mph	
DNF	8	(United Kingdom) R.M. White	6-7 hp BAT-JAP	6	Retired on lap 7. Stripped magneto drive bevel pinion.		
DNF	29	(United Kingdom) J.C. Smythe	5 hp Rex	6	Retired on lap 7.		
DNF	31	(German Empire) Martin Geiger	6 hp Two-speed NSU	5	Retired on lap 6 due to valve trouble		
DNF	31	(United Kingdom) Frank Applebee Jun.	5 hp Rex	5	Retired on lap 6.		
DNF	18	(United Kingdom) Charlie Bennett	5 hp Vindec Special	4	Retired at the end of lap 4, collar came off exhaust pipe		
DNF	28	(United Kingdom) Billy Heaton	5 hp Rex	4	Retired on lap 5.		
DNF	2	(United Kingdom) Rem Fowler	6 hp Norton	3	Retired on lap 4.		
DNF	38	(United Kingdom) James Baxter	5 hp Rex	2	Sideslipped in Ballacraine on lap 1. Injured right leg and knee, continued and retired on lap 3.		
DNF	19	(United Kingdom) W. Gurr	5 hp Four-cylinder FN	0	Crashed on 1st lap.		
DNF	23	(United Kingdom) Edward G. Young	3½ hp Acme	0	Retired on 1st lap. Back cylinder refused to fire		
DNF	35	(Italy) Ernesto Gnesa	3½ hp Acme	0	Retired on 1st lap due broken cylinder.		
DNS	25	(United Kingdom) E. Varney	7 hp Crownfield		Met with an accident on a way to the Island and was unable to compete.		
Fastest lap: Harry Bashall, 22min. 27sec. 42.45 mph (New record).
