= AJR (disambiguation) =

AJR is an American indie pop band.

AJR or Ajr may also refer to:

- AJR (motorcycle), built in Scotland
- Abdominojugular reflux, a test to measure venous pressure
- Academy for Jewish Religion (California)
- Academy for Jewish Religion (New York)
- Aliança da Juventude Revolucionária, a youth movement in Brazil
- Allison Jones Rushing (born 1982), judge of the US Court of Appeals for the Fourth Circuit
- American Journal of Roentgenology
- American Journalism Review
- Arvidsjaur Airport, Sweden, IATA code
- Association of Jewish Refugees, UK
- Axholme Joint Railway, a former British railway company
- Iran Ajr, an Iranian landing craft used to lay naval mines
