= 1924 Isle of Man TT =

Annual motorcycle racing event

1924 Isle of Man Tourist Trophy
- Date: June 23, 25 and 27, 1924
- Location: Douglas, Isle of Man
- Course: Snaefell Mountain Course; 37.739 miles (60.74 km).
- Organiser: Auto-Cycle Union
- Clerk: T.W. Loughborough

Junior TT
- First: Ken Tremlow, New Imperial
- Second: Syd Ollerhead, DOT-JAP
- Third: I.H.R. Scott, AJS

Fastest lap
- Jimmy Simpson; 35min. 5sec. 64.54 mph New record

Ultra Lightweight TT
- First: Jock Porter, New Gerrard
- Second: Freddie Morgan, Cotton
- Third: Chris Stead, Cotton

Fastest lap
- Jock Porter; 43min. 2sec. 52.61 mph New record

Sidecar TT
- First: George Tucker, Norton; Walter Moore
- Second: Harry Reed, DOT-JAP; Joe Hooson
- Third: Almond Tinkler, Matador; U.R. Tinkler

Fastest lap
- Freddie Dixon; 43min. 32sec. 53.23 mph

Lightweight TT
- First: Edwin Tremlow, New Imperial
- Second: Harry Brockbank, Cotton
- Third: Jack Cooke, DOT-JAP

Fastest lap
- Edwin Tremlow; 38min. 51sec. 58.28 mph New record

Senior TT
- First: Alec Bennett, Norton
- Second: Harry Langman, Scott
- Third: Freddie Dixon, Douglas

Fastest lap
- Freddie Dixon; 35min. 31sec. 63.75 mph New record

The 1924 Isle of Man Tourist Trophy saw the introduction of the Ultra-Lightweight class for motorcycles of 175 cc capacity that was run only twice, in 1924 and 1925. This was the second year of the Sidecar race that would also be dropped after 1925.

The Ultra-Lightweight TT began with a massed-start for competitors rather than pairs as with the normal time-trial format of the TT races. The winner of the first Ultra-Lightweight TT was Jock Porter riding a New Gerrard at an average speed of 51.21 mph (82.41 km/h).

The Junior TT race was won by Ken Twemlow on a New Imperial at an average speed of 55.67 mph (89.59 km/h). In the same Junior race, Jimmie Simpson set a new lap record of 35 minutes and 5 seconds at an average speed of 64.54 mph (103.87 km/h) on an AJS – the first average lap-speed over 60 mph. The Lightweight and Senior TT races were run in conjunction, and Eddie Twemlow (brother to Ken Twemlow) riding a New Imperial won the six-lap race in 4 hours, 5 minutes and 3 seconds, an average speed of 55.44 mph (89.22 km/h).

The Senior TT, like the Junior race, was also run at a record breaking pace and was the first with a race-average speed over 60 mph (97 km/h). The six-lap race was won by Alec Bennett riding a Norton in 3 hours, 40 minutes and 24. 6 seconds, with an average speed of 61.64 mph (99.20 km/h).

== Senior TT (500cc) ==
Rank	Rider	Team	Speed	Time	Laps
1	(United Kingdom) Alec Bennett	Norton	3.40.24.6	61.64 mph (99.20 km/h)	6
2	(United Kingdom) Harry Langman	Scott	3.41.54.2	61.23	6
3	(United Kingdom) Freddie Dixon	Douglas	3.45.46.4	60.17	6
9	(Scotland) J A Stuart	Norton	3.59.05.0		6

== Junior TT (350cc) ==
6 laps (226.38 miles) – Mountain Course.

Rank	Rider	Team	Speed	Time
1	(United Kingdom) Kenneth Twemlow	New Imperial	56.68 mph	4:04.49.0
2	(United Kingdom) S. Ollerhead	DOT	54.91 mph	4:07.26.2
3	(South Africa) I. H. R. Scott	AJS	54.55 mph	4:09.01.6
4	(United Kingdom) Cecil Ashby	Montgomery	53.39 mph	4:14.27.4
5	(United Kingdom) Harold J. Willis	Montgomery	52.80 mph	4:17.18.8
6	(United Kingdom) J. L. E. Emerson	DOT		4:20.39.8
7	(United Kingdom) F. Simpson Jnr	Excelsior		4:28.55.2
8	(United Kingdom) L. Nicholson	OEC-Blackburne		4:31.38.0
9	(United Kingdom) F. R. Marston	AJS		4:31.39.0
10	(United Kingdom) J. W. Shaw	Zenith		4:43.48.4

== Lightweight TT (250 cc) ==
6 laps (226.38 miles) – Mountain Course.

Rank	Rider	Team	Speed	Time
1	(United Kingdom) Edwin Twemlow	New Imperial	55.44 mph	4:05.03.0
2	(United Kingdom) H. F. Brocklebank	Cotton	52.85 mph	4:17.05.0
3	(United Kingdom) J. Cooke	DOT	52.54 mph	4:18.03.0
4	(United Kingdom) L. J. Cridland	JES	51.84 mph	4:22.03.0
5	(United Kingdom) P. Pike	Levis	51.16 mph	4:25.31.0
6	(United Kingdom) H. F. Harris	New Imperial	50.50 mph	4:29.01.0
7	(United Kingdom) F. Simpson Jnr	Excelsior		4:32.50.0
8	(United Kingdom) C. G. S. Cleare	OK-Supreme		4:38.50.0
9	(Republic of Ireland) C. W. Johnston	Cotton		4:40.23.0
10	(United Kingdom) Geoff S.Davison	Levis		4:52.40.0

== Ultra-Lightweight TT ==
It was held on Wednesday, June 25, 1924, over a distance of 113 miles and 380 yards, 3 laps of 37.75 miles each. The machines were limited of cylinder capacity not exceeding 175cc. All seventeen riders started the race simultaneously, only twenty yards separating the last numbered man from the first. Eleven riders finished.

The 13th International Isle of Man Tourist Trophy

Pos	#	Rider	Bike	Ultra Lightweight TT race classification			
Pos	#	Rider	Bike	Laps	Time	Speed	Prizes & Remarks
1	1	(Scotland) Jock Porter	174cc New Gerrard	3	2:12:40.40	51.20 mph	1st Prize - Winner of Ultra Lightweight Tourist Trophy, £20.
2	15	(United Kingdom) Freddie Morgan	175cc Cotton	3	2:17:11.40	49.51 mph	2nd Prize - £10.
3	10	(Isle of Man) Chris Stead	175cc Cotton	3	2:17:39.80	49.34 mph	3rd Prize - £5.
4	2	(United Kingdom) Geoff Davison	173cc Levis	3	2:23:00.40	47.49 mph	Silver replica.
5	11	(United Kingdom) Harry Brockbank	175cc Cotton	3	2:26:59.00	46.21 mph	
6	6	(United Kingdom) Tommy Meeten	173cc Francis-Barnett	3	2:44:43.00	41.24 mph	
7	13	(United Kingdom) B.B. Smith	173cc Wee Macgregor	3	2:51:59.00	39.50 mph	
8	8	(Isle of Man) Jimmy Oates	173cc Powell	3	2:54:32.00	38.92 mph	
9	3	(Canada) Alec Bennett	175cc Diamond	3	2:57:09.00	38.35 mph	
10	4	(United Kingdom) Dan Young	173cc Wee Macgregor	3	3:07:07.00	36.30 mph	
11	5	(United Kingdom) Doug Prentice	Mackenzie	3	3:10:10.00	35.72 mph	
DNS	17	(United Kingdom) Percy Dallison	170cc Omega-Norman		Was unable to start and Gus Kuhn took over his entry.		
Fastest lap: Jock Porter, 43min. 2sec. 52.61 mph

== Sidecar TT ==
It was held on Wednesday, June 25, 1924, at 2:00pm over a distance of 150 miles and 1,680 yards, 4 laps of 37.75 miles each. Sidecar TT machines were limited of cylinder capacity not exceeding 600cc. Out of 10 entries, nine started the race at one minute intervals and only five finished.

The 13th International Isle of Man Tourist Trophy

Pos	#	Driver	Passenger	Bike	Sidecar TT race classification			
Pos	#	Driver	Passenger	Bike	Laps	Time	Speed	Prizes & Remarks
1	6	(United Kingdom) George Tucker	(Wales) Walter Moore	588cc Norton	4	2:56:34.20	51.31 mph	1st Prize - Winner of Sidecar Tourist Trophy, £20.
2	2	(United Kingdom) Harry Reed	(United Kingdom) Joe Hooson	349cc DOT-Bradshaw	4	3:26:46.40	43.80 mph	Silver replica for the driver and bronze replica for the passenger. Reed drove last two laps with broken forks.
3	10	(United Kingdom) Almond Tinkler	(United Kingdom) N.R. Tinkler	349cc Matador	4	3:33:08.40	42.49 mph	Silver replica for the driver and bronze replica for the passenger
4	9	(United Kingdom) J.W. Taylor	(United Kingdom) R.J. Lilley	350cc New Scale	4	3:35:40.00	41.99 mph	Silver replica for the driver and bronze replica for the passenger
5	3	(Scotland) George Grinton	(Isle of Man) Tony Mahon	588cc Norton	4	3:36:27.00	41.83 mph	Grinton's throttle wire broke on lap 1 and he rode the race holding it in his hand, which at the end was cut and bleeding.
DNF	4	(United Kingdom) Bert Taylor	(United Kingdom) C.R. Hirst	590cc OEC-Blackburne	3	Retired on last lap at Ballaugh with engine trouble.		
DNF	8	(United Kingdom) S.E. Longman	(Isle of Man) Arthur Kinrade	600cc Coventry-Victor Super-Six	2	Retired on lap 3 at Gooseneck with engine trouble.		
DNF	1	(United Kingdom) Freddie Dixon	(United Kingdom) Walter Denny	596cc Douglas	2	Retired on lap 3 while leading the race at Kirkmichael with engine trouble.		
DNF	7	(Scotland) Alfie Alexander	(United Kingdom) S. Ford	596cc Douglas	2	Retired on lap 3 while running third, due broken sidecar stay, pushing the machine in from Governor's Bridge to Start.		
DNS	5	(United Kingdom) Freddie Hatton		596cc New Hudson				
Fastest lap: Freddie Dixon, 43min. 32sec. 53.23 mph
