= Academy for Jewish Religion =

Academy for Jewish Religion may refer to:

- Academy for Jewish Religion (California)
- Academy for Jewish Religion (New York)
