= 1910 in motorsport =

The following is an overview of the events of 1910 in motorsport including the major racing events, motorsport venues that were opened and closed during a year, championships and non-championship events that were established and disestablished in a year, and the births and deaths of racing drivers and other motorsport people.

== Annual events ==
The calendar includes only major annual non-championship events or events that have their own significance separate from the championship. For the dates of the championship events, see related season articles.

| Date | Event | Ref |
|---|---|---|
| 15 May | 5th Targa Florio | |
| 26 May | 4th Isle of Man TT | |

== Opened motorsport venues ==
- 12 August - Opening of the Indianapolis Motor Speedway.

== Births ==
| Date | Month | Name | Nationality | Occupation | Note | Ref |
|---|---|---|---|---|---|---|
| 7 | September | Lee Wallard | American | Racing driver | Winner of the Indianapolis 500 (1951) | |
