= Devil's Elbow, Isle of Man =

Hairpin bend on a road in the Isle of Man

Coordinates: 54°15′20″N 4°37′32″W

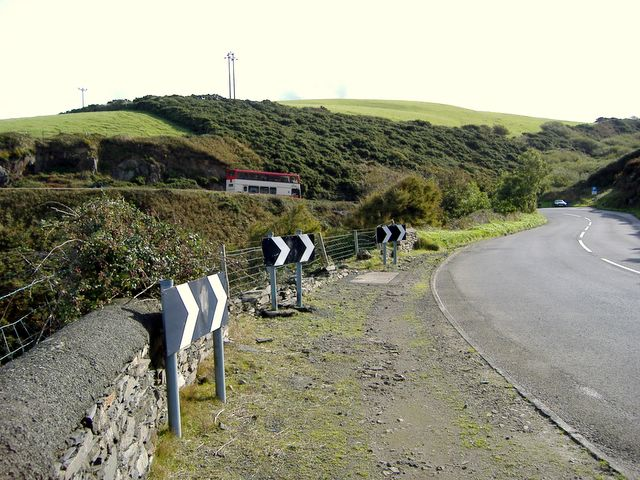
The 'Devils elbow', Isle of Man A tricky bend to negotiate on the Peel to Kirk Michael road.

Devil's Elbow (Manx: Glion Cam or Glen Cam the Winding Glen) is a hairpin bend situated on the primary A4 Peel to Kirk Michael coast road in the Isle of Man parish of German.

The A4 road follows the island's west coast and the Devil's Elbow hairpin intersects Glion Cam, a small wooded glen and former quarry situated between Lower Ballakaighen and Skerrisdale Moar. The former Peel to Ramsey line of the Manx Northern Railway also runs parallel to the coast road from Knocksharry to Glen Wyllin near Kirk Michael at this point. This includes the nearby Gob-y-Deigan or the Donkey Bank and a further railway embankment at Lady Port on the western-edge of Glen Cam which is 70 feet (21 m) high formed of 50,000 cubic yards (38,000 m^{3}) of excavated material from a nearby railway cutting.

The Devil's Elbow was part of the Short Highland Course as part of the Peel Loop used for Tourist Trophy car races held between 1905 and 1907. It was part of the 15-mile (24 km) 1,470-yard (1,340 m) St. John's Short Course used for motorcycle racing in the Isle of Man TT races between 1907 and 1910, situated at the 9th milestone, 416 feet (127 m) above sea level.
