= Acme Motor Co =

British motorcycle manufacturer, 1902–1922

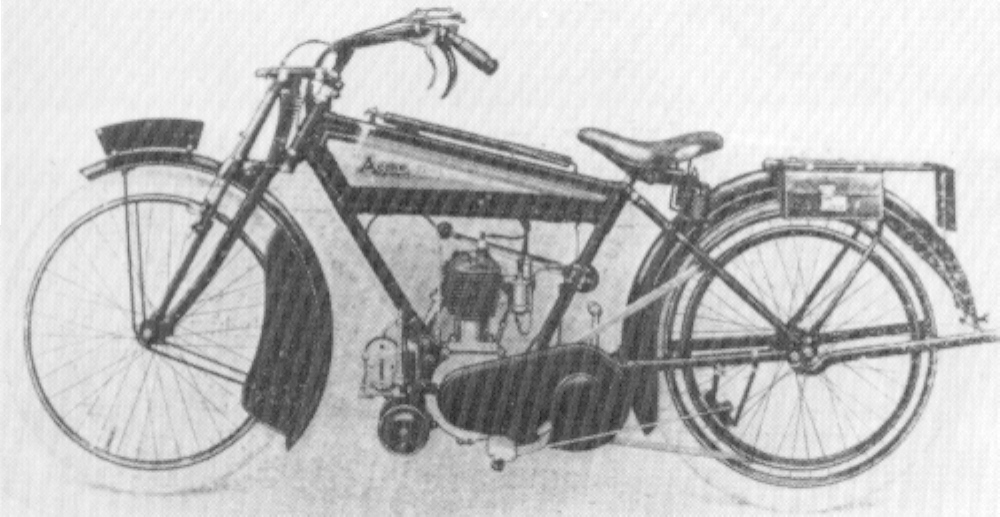
- 1922 Acme with a 293 cc JAP engine
- Industry: Motorcycle manufacturer
- Founded: 1902 in Earlsdon, Coventry, England
- Defunct: 1922
- Fate: Merged with Rex motorcycles
- Successor: Rex-Acme

The Acme Motor Co is a defunct manufacturer of motorcycles that operated from premises in Earlsdon, Coventry. The company started manufacturing in 1902. It was taken over by Rex motorcycles sometime before 1920. In 1922 the name of the company was changed to Coventry Acme Motor Co, later that year the company was merged with Rex motorcycles to form Rex-Acme.

== History ==
=== Pre-WW1 ===
The first motorcycles produced in 1902 used Minerva engines. Models using 2.75hp and 4.5hp Automoto engines were soon added, as was a 3hp model with an engine made by Acme. From 1904 the Automoto engines were produced under license by Acme. In 1908 two machines were entered in the Isle of Man TT, but both retired on the first lap. After this no further machines were entered into the TT Races.

The company filed a number of patents, including one for a sprung frame in 1916.

=== Post-WW1 ===
After a break during the First World War production resumed in 1918 under managing director George Henry Hemingway. The post-war models used engines from JAP and also Acme built 350 cc side-valve single and 997 cc V-twin engines. A car was produced in limited numbers in 1919.

In 1920 a 976 cc V-twin combination was introduced with 8hp JAP engine, a three-speed Sturmey Archer gearbox, Brampton Biflex forks and chain drive. The engine was produced to Acme's specification with the magneto drive on the left to allow better access to the ignition points. In 1921 a 2¾ hp single-cylinder machine with two gears was added. These later machines were almost identical to those produced by Rex motorcycles, who by this time had taken over Acme. The two companies merged in 1922 and Rex-Acme machines were produced until 1933.
