= 1908 in motorsport =

The following is an overview of the events of 1908 in motorsport including the major racing events, motorsport venues that were opened and closed during a year, championships and non-championship events that were established and disestablished in a year, and births and deaths of racing drivers and other motorsport people.

== Annual events ==
The calendar includes only annual major non-championship events or annual events that had own significance separate from the championship. For the dates of the championship events see related season articles.

Date	Event	Ref
18 May	3rd Targa Florio	
22 September	2nd Isle of Man TT	

== Births ==
Date	Month	Name	Nationality	Occupation	Note	Ref
26	February	Jean-Pierre Wimille	French	Racing driver	24 Hours of Le Mans winner (1937, 1939).	
18	December	Bill Holland	American	Racing driver	Indianapolis 500 winner (1949).	
