= 1909 in motorsport =

The following is an overview of the events of 1909 in motorsport including the major racing events, motorsport venues that were opened and closed during a year, championships and non-championship events that were established and disestablished in a year, and births and deaths of racing drivers and other motorsport people.

== Annual events ==
The calendar includes only annual major non-championship events or annual events that had own significance separate from the championship. For the dates of the championship events see related season articles.

Date	Event	Ref
2 May	4th Targa Florio	
23 September	3rd Isle of Man TT	

== Births ==
Date	Month	Name	Nationality	Occupation	Note	Ref
15	January	Jean Bugatti	French	Automotive designer and test engineer		
24	February	George Robson	American	Racing driver	Indianapolis 500 winner (1946).	
6	April	Hermann Lang	German	Racing driver	24 Hours of Le Mans winner (1952).	
12	April	Jean Trémoulet	French	Racing driver	24 Hours of Le Mans winner (1938).	
28	December	David Murray	British	Racing driver	One of the first British Formula One drivers.	
