= Dunelt Motorcycles =

British motorcycle manufacturer

- Industry: Manufacturing and engineering
- Founded: 1919
- Defunct: 1957
- Fate: Diversified and ceased motorcycle production
- Headquarters: Sheffield, UK
- Key people: Dunford and Elliott
- Products: Motorcycles & Bicycles

Dunelt Motorcycles was a British motorcycle and bicycle manufacturer. Based in Sheffield, the business was founded by two steel makers and engineers, Dunford and Elliott (Dunelt is a combination of their names) of Sheffield in 1919. Their first motorcycle was an innovative supercharged 499 cc two-stroke single. The company specialised in good quality sidecars from 1926 and a Dunelt motorcycle was first to cross the desert from Cairo to Siwa and back in 1924. Dunelt also enjoyed racing success and won the Double Twelve Hour World Record at Brooklands with a Model K in 1928. Dunelt moved into commercial three-wheeled cars but these were not a success. A Dunelt moped was exhibited at the Earls Court show in 1956 but the company diversified into other areas of engineering in 1957.

== History ==
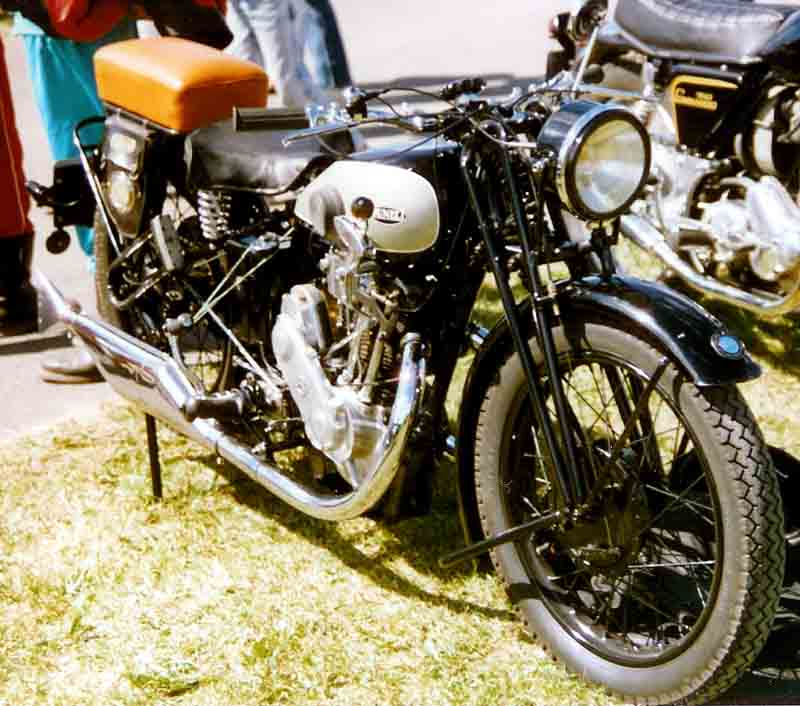
Dunelt motorcycle

Dunford & Elliott (Sheffield) Ltd started in 1902 as steel-makers. Their Birmingham factory was established in order to make components for car manufacturers. Dunelt Motorcycles was a British motorcycle and bicycle manufacturer. Dunelt is a combination of the surnames DUNford and ELliotT.

Their first motorcycle was an innovative supercharged 499 cc two-stroke single. The company specialised in good quality sidecars from 1926 and a Dunelt motorcycle was first to cross the desert from Cairo to Siwa and back in 1924. Dunelt also enjoyed racing success and won the Double Twelve Hour World Record at Brooklands with a Model K in 1928. Noted for their supercharged engines, this was their own patented design, in which the supercharging is achieved by transfer of gases from the crankcase to the cylinder. Dunelt also hoped to increase sales to women motorcyclists; in 1927 a young German woman, Suzanne Koerner, rode a Dunelt motorcycle from Berlin to Birmingham.

During the 1920s the company also marketed a variety of delivery vehicles based around motorcycle combinations. A van, a small van, truck and box carrier were advertised until 1929. They were powered by Dunelt's own 499cc single-cylinder engine. The three-wheeler commercial vehicle market was a difficult one for all motorcycle manufacturers, and Dunelt did not have the success they wished for in this area. From 1929, most of the combinations were discontinued and, by 1930, they also stopped producing their own engines. Sturmey-Archer and Villiers units were used instead and, from 1933, they also fitted Rudge Python and J.A.P. engines.

During the industrial depression of the late 1920s manufacturers were re-assessing their businesses as a result of the economic climate. Dunelt's Birmingham factory closed in 1931. In 1935 Dunelt produced their last real motorcycle and went on to develop outboard motors,

Raynal purchased the rights to build Dunelt Cycles in 1937, buying into an established brand name, and ready access to its network of retailers. 1938 advertising showed the Dunelt Cycle Co now listed as Raynal's factory address at Woodburn Road, Handsworth, Birmingham, 21.

Raynal was bought out by Tube Investments in 1950. TI acquired Raynal in order to secure the Dunelt Cycles brand, and in 1951 the business now listed its office address as Dunelt Cycle Co Ltd, Cornwall Road, Smethwick, Birmingham 40 This address was close the old Raynal cycle works, it is possible that manufacturing had not moved at all.

TI Reynolds Tube Manipulators produced a series of prototype model mopeds in the mid-1950s, one version of which, fitted with a Rex engine, was branded as a Dunelt . This moped never reached production.

In February 1959 Dunelt Cycle Co Ltd had their registered office at Rabone Lane, Smethwick, Birmingham 40. This address was on the other side of the old Raynal factory block, which was renamed ‘Attercliffe Works’ in some reflection back to Dunford & Elliott's history from that area of Sheffield.

Dunelt branded cycles continued to be sold up to the last years of the 1960s, headstock badges on these later machines state that they were built in Nottingham. The brand had been transferred to Raleigh. The Raynal factory would appear to have been disposed of sometime during the decade.

== Models ==
Model	Year	Notes
Model K	1926	250 cc two-stroke
Royal	1928	
Royal deluxe	1928	
Majectic	1928	four-stroke with a 350 cc Sturmey-Archer engine.
Model T	1930	250 cc
Model S	1930	250 cc
Model SD	1930	250 cc
Dunelt 297 cc	1931	Sturmey-Archer side-valve engine
Dunelt 348 cc	1931	Sturmey-Archer
Dunelt 346 cc	1931	Villiers two-stroke
Dunelt 496 cc	1931	Sturmey-Archer
Dunelt 598cc	1931	Sturmey-Archer side-valve engine
Dunelt 148 cc	1932	Villiers
Dunelt 350 cc	1932	Villiers
Model T special	1933	Python (Rudge) engine
Dunelt 248 cc	1934	Python (Rudge) engine
Dunelt 499 cc	1934	Python (Rudge) engine
Dunelt 248 cc	1934	Python (Rudge) engine
Dunelt 245 cc	1934	JAP engine
Dunelt 490 cc	1934	JAP engine
Dunelt Moped	1956	
