= 1907 Isle of Man TT =

Annual motorcycle racing event

1907 Isle of Man Tourist Trophy

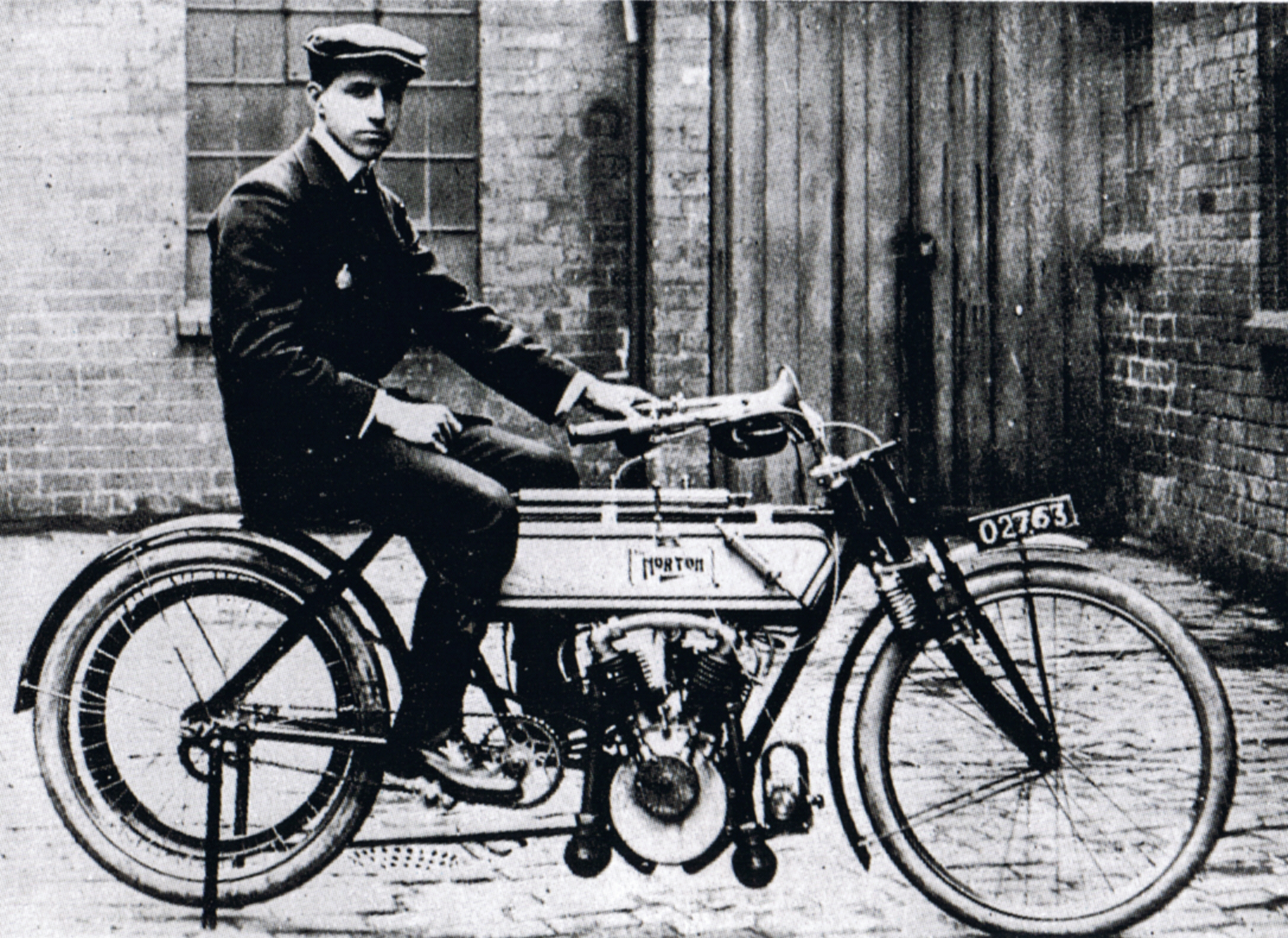
- Date: 28 May 1907
- Location: St John's, Isle of Man
- Course: St John's Short Course; 15 miles, 1,470 yards (25.49 km)
- Organiser: The Auto-Cycle Club
- Secretary: F. Straight esq.

Single Cylinder class
- First: Charlie Collier, Matchless-JAP
- Second: Jack Marshall, Triumph
- Third: Frank Hulbert, Triumph

Fastest lap
- Harry Collier; 23min. 5 2/5sec. 41.81 mph

Twin Cylinder class
- First: Rem Fowler, Norton-Peugeot
- Second: Billy Wells, Vindec Special-Peugeot
- Third: Billy Heaton, Rex

Fastest lap
- Rem Fowler; 22min. 6 2/5sec. 42.91 mph (New record)

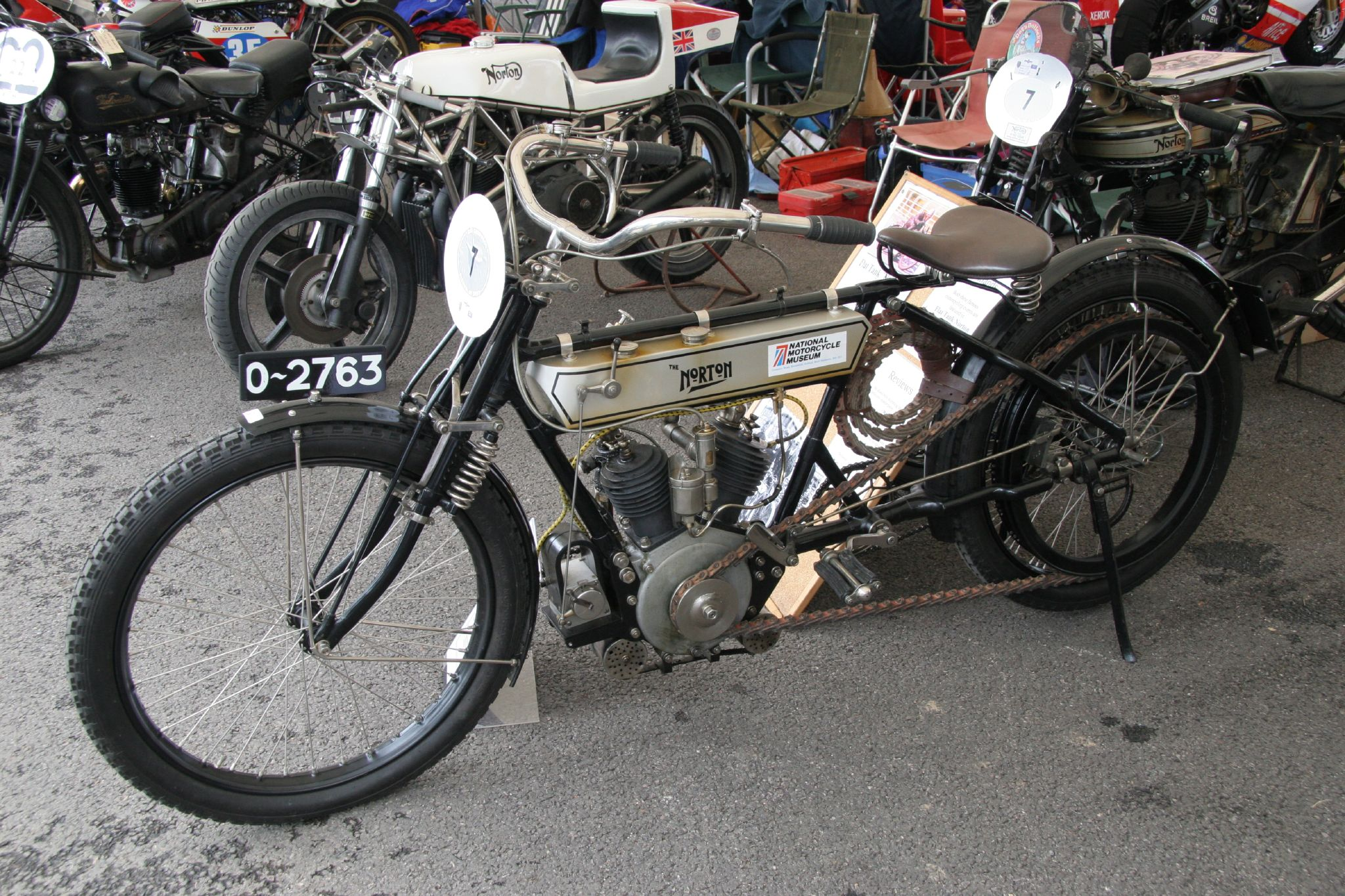
1907 Norton

The 1907 Isle of Man TT races were the inaugural International Tourist Trophy for motor-cycles held on the Isle of Man. The event was held on Tuesday 28 May 1907 over the St John's Short Course consisting of a Single Cylinder and a Twin-Cylinder class. The race was ten laps of the 15 mile 1,430 yards course, a total race distance of 158 miles 220 yards (226.071 km).

At 10am on the Tuesday 28 May 1907, 25 riders started in pairs in a time-trial format for the road-legal touring motorcycles with exhaust silencers, saddles, pedals and mud-guards. On lap 1, Jack Marshall riding a Triumph suffered a fall and Frank Applebee Junior a puncture to his 5 hp Rex machine. By lap 2, Stanley Webb riding a 5 hp Triumph had to stop at St. Johns to adjust a drive-belt and retired on lap 3 with an engine exhaust-valve problem. At the compulsory 10‑minute replenishment stop, Oliver Godfrey had to retire when his 5 hp Rex motorcycle caught fire.

The Single Cylinder class race was won by Charles R. Collier riding a Matchless in 4 hours, 8 minutes and 8 seconds at an average race speed of 38.21 mph. His brother Harry Collier, also riding a Matchless, had problems with an engine seizure on lap 2 and eventually retired on lap 9.

The Twin-Cylinder class and overall race was initially led by Rem Fowler riding a Norton. On lap 1, Fowler completed the course in 23 minutes and 19 seconds, in second place was Billy Wells in a time of 23 minutes and 21 seconds and Charlie Collier in the single-cylinder class with a time of 23 minutes and 45 seconds. The overall lead fell away as Fowler suffered a number of problems with drive-belts and spark-plugs, and on lap 7 crashed at nearly 60 mph due to a burst tyre at the "Devils Elbow" on the Kirk Michael to Peel section of the course. Fowler nearly gave up, but was told by a spectator that he led the twin-cylinder class by 30 minutes from Billy Wells and went on to win at an average race speed of 36.22 mph and set the fastest lap of the race at 42.91 mph.

== 1907 International Auto-Cycle Tourist Trophy ==
Tuesday 28 May 1907 – 10 laps (158 miles 220 yards) St. John's Short Course.

(Isle of Man) The 1st International Auto-cycle Tourist Trophy

Pos	#	Rider	Bike	Single Cylinder race classification			
Pos	#	Rider	Bike	Laps	Time	Speed	Prizes
1	4	(United Kingdom) Charlie Collier	3 1/2 hp Matchless-JAP 431cc	10	4:08.08.2	38.21 mph	1st Prize - Trophy, £25 and S.F. Edge's prize for best British-made machine.
2	2	(United Kingdom) Jack Marshall	3 1/2 hp Triumph 475cc	10	4:19.47.3	36.60 mph	2nd Prize - £15 and G.F. Spicer's prize.
3	1	(United Kingdom) Frank Hulbert	3 1/2 hp Triumph 475cc	10	4:27.49.4	35.50 mph	3rd Prize - £10
4	5	(United Kingdom) Rupert Brice	3 1/2 hp Brown 475cc	10	5:03.55.2	31.40 mph	
5	14	(German Empire) Martin Geiger	3hp NSU 331cc	10	5:10.26.0	30.60 mph	Marquis de St. Mar's Prize for the best Foreign-made machine.
6	8	(United Kingdom) J. C. Smythe	3hp Rex 331cc	10	5:23.40.3	29.40 mph	
7	11	(United Kingdom) Robert Ayton	3 1/2 hp Ayton-Riley Special 464cc	10	5:30.26.0	29.10 mph	£5 for the 1st Private owners' machine.
8	10	(United Kingdom) Frank W. Applebee	3 1/2 hp Rex 475cc	10	5:46.31.0	27.40 mph	
9	17	(United Kingdom) John Le Grand	3hp Two-speed G.B.	6	Finished course outside of time.		
DNF	3	(United Kingdom) Harry Collier	3 1/2 hp Matchless-JAP	9	Retired on lap 9 due to broken exhaust valve, smashed piston.		
DNF	18	(United Kingdom) Bob Duke	3 1/2 hp Triumph	8	Retired on lap 9.		
DNF	15	(United Kingdom) Tom Silver	3 3/4 hp Thomas Silver	6	Retired on lap 7.		
DNF	19	(German Empire) George Horner	4hp Royal Cavendish-JAP	4	Retired on lap 5.		
DNF	15	(United Kingdom) Stanley Webb	3 1/2 hp Triumph	2	Retired on lap 3 due to broken valve.		
DNF	12	(United Kingdom) James D. Hamilton	3hp NSU	1	Retired on lap 2.		
DNF	6	(United Kingdom) F. Winter	4hp R.O.C.	1	Retired on lap 2.		
DNF	9	(United Kingdom) Walter Jacobs	3 1/2 hp Rex	0	Crashed on first lap.		
DNS	7	(United Kingdom) Howard C. Newman	4hp R.O.C.		Crashed in practice.		
		(Republic of Ireland) Charles Franklin	3 1/2 hp JAP		Entry withdrawn.		
		(United Kingdom) H.G. Cove	3 1/2 hp Minerva		Entry withdrawn due to illness.		
		(United Kingdom) W.D. Coplestone	3 1/2 hp Peugeot		Entry withdrawn. Bike was not delivered in time for him to satisfactorily test the machine before the race.		
		(Isle of Man)	The Isle of Man Motor Co.		Entry withdrawn.		
		Fastest lap: Harry Collier, 23min. 5 2/5sec. 41.81 mph on lap 4.					

Pos	#	Rider	Bike	Twin Cylinder race classification			
Pos	#	Rider	Bike	Laps	Time	Speed	Prizes
1	22	(United Kingdom) Rem Fowler	5hp Norton-Peugeot 671.4cc	10	4:21.52.8	36.21 mph	1st Prize - Trophy, £25 and Dr. Hele-Shaw's Prize.
2	21	(United States) Billy Wells	5hp Vindec Special-Peugeot 671.4cc	10	4:53.44.5	32.30 mph	2nd Prize - £15
3	26	(United Kingdom) Billy Heaton	5hp Rex 725.6cc	10	5:11.03.5	30.50 mph	£5 for the 1st Private owners' machine.
4	25	(United Kingdom) Arnold Dent	5hp Vindec Special-Peugeot 671.4cc	10			The Schulte prize best performance with a two-speed gear.
DNF	24	(United Kingdom) Theodore Tessier	6hp BAT-JAP	4	Retired on lap 5.		
DNF	23	(United Kingdom) Harry Martin	5hp Kerry	4	Retired on lap 5 due to engine trouble.		
DNF	20	(United Kingdom) Oliver Godfrey	5hp Rex	4	Bike caught fire during refueling.		
DNF	27	(United Kingdom) Frank Applebee Jun.	5hp Rex	3	Retired on lap 4.		
Fastest lap: Rem Fowler, 22min. 6 2/5sec. 42.91 mph on lap 6.
