= Jenni Asher =

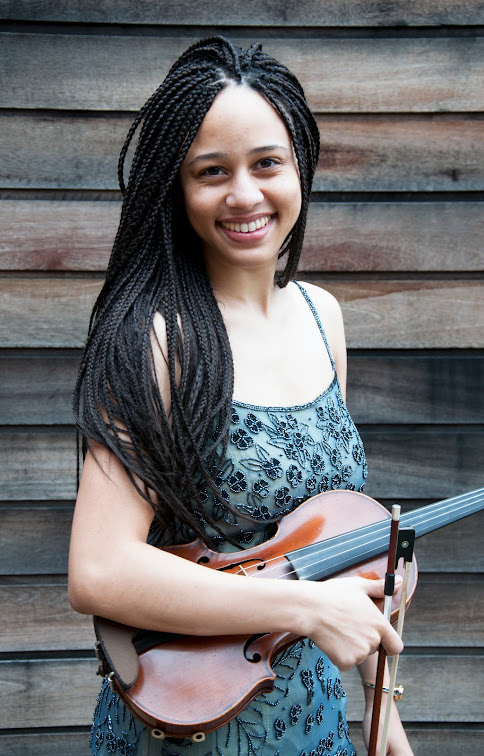
- Born: 1987 (age 38–39)
- Occupation: Musician
- Children: 2
- Website: jenniasher.com

Jenni Asher (born 1987) is an American musician, composer, and cantor. She is the first Black American woman to be ordained as a cantor.

== Early life and education ==
Asher grew up in Pasadena, California. She was introduced to music at a young age; her mother took her to orchestral concerts and her father was a singer who enjoyed jazz. At age four, she decided she wanted to be a violinist. Asher was isolated as a child; raised in the Worldwide Church of God, she was homeschooled, and music events were her main exposure to the secular world.

Asher moved to London at age 18 to pursue higher education; she lived in the city for the next nine years. While living in London, she began attending services at London's Central Synagogue, and decided to convert to Judaism. Although first attending Orthodox services, she converted through the Conservative American Jewish University. Later she underwent an Orthodox conversion through a Sephardic rabbinical court; according to her, she did this so that her family could fully participate in Orthodox communities.

Asher earned a Bachelor's degree in Violin Performance with a minor in Jazz Voice from the Royal Academy of Music in 2010, and a Master's degree in Music Leadership from the Guildhall School of Music and Drama in 2012. She also studied for a year at Trinity Laban Conservatoire of Music and Dance in Greenwich.

== Career ==
Asher has worked as a cantorial soloist since 2020. As of September 2024, Asher works as the music director and cantor for Hamakom, a Conservative synagogue in West Hills, California. She became the first Black American woman ordained as a cantor in 2025, when she was ordained by the Academy for Jewish Religion California.

=== Music ===
Asher has released three albums: London (2014), Freedom (2017), and Yaladati (2021). In addition to violin, Asher also plays cello, double bass, erhu, piano, and viola. Her 2021 album, Yaladati, was self-produced and self-composed over the course of four years, with Asher singing and playing all the instruments on the album.

Asher composes settings for Jewish prayers, but commented in 2024, "I’ve been finding my compositions aren’t needed. There is so much to preserve, so much that is being lost that’s really beautiful, amazing music. I think a lot of people have gotten quite caught up in this idea that...they need to create new music for it to be meaningful. I think I used to feel that way, I don’t any more".

Asher worked as a private and school music teacher before becoming a cantor.

=== Musician Bodywork ===
Asher founded Musician Bodywork, a massage business focusing on serving musicians. The business was inspired by her own experiences with tendonitis throughout her teenage years. She earned her massage certification in 2009, and worked as a massage therapist at the Royal Academy of Music while attending the school as a student. She is a member of the Performing Arts Medicine Association. Asher has also taught classes on massage therapy for violinists.

== Personal life ==
Asher met her ex-husband, who is Egyptian-Jewish, in a chat room in 1999. The two married after she returned to the United States in 2015. They share two children.
