= Allard & Co =

Allard & Co. was a British manufacturing company, established in 1889 in Coventry by Frederick W. Allard and George Pilkington as cycle makers.

In 1898 the company produced a 3-wheel motorised tricycle together with its first car. Car manufacturing started in 1899.

In 1901 the company merged with the Birmingham Motor Manufacturing and Supply Co and was renamed as Rex Motor Manufacturing Co.

== Vehicles ==
Allard moved into the motor industry building a four-seater 4½ hp model based on the Benz, followed by a 3 hp air-cooled car with an engine said to be of their own manufacture.

In 1902 they offered a 9 hp single-cylinder light car.

It is unknown how many if any have survived to present day.

== See also ==
- List of car manufacturers of the United Kingdom
