= Motorcycling Ireland =

Governing body for motorcycle racing in Ireland

- Abbreviation: MCI
- Formation: 1902
- Type: Sports federation for Moto racing
- Headquarters: Unit 18, BEAT Centre, Stephenstown Industrial Estate
- Location: Balbriggan, County Dublin
- Region served: Ireland
- President: David McCann
- Main organ: Board of Directors
- Affiliations: FIM
- Website: www.motorcyclingireland.ie

Motorcycling Ireland (MCI) is the Southern Centre of the Motor Cycle Union of Ireland (MCUI) and they are the governing body of motorcycle racing in Leinster, Munster and Connaught. They work together alongside their partners in Ulster, the MCUI (Ulster Centre) and Motorcycle Racing Association Ireland (MRA) to make up the MCUI.

On 7 March 2002 the MCUI became the first Motorcycle Federation in the world to reach 100 years old.

Motorcycle racing is growing in popularity, in 2019 Mondello Park international circuit hosted 26 motorcycle racing days, compared to 11 for car racing. Nonetheless, spiraling event insurance costs caused reduction of events in 2017.

In 2023, insurance costs more than tripled with clubs unable to afford it which has led to most MCI activities in 2023 being cancelled.

Irish Motorcycle Racing Disciplines
Enduro
Motocross
Road Race
Short Circuit
Touring
Trials
Veteran & Vintage

== Controversies ==
In 2016 Motorcycling Ireland blocked a beach race from taking place in Portmarnock on 22 May by submitting an objection to the Fingal County Council, who initially have approved the event. Motocross clubs promptly reorganized the event to an Open Grass Track event in Ballough Lusk, County Dublin the following weekend.

== EGM 2023 ==
After all members of the board were stood down after an EGM due to a vote of no confidence, a new board was appointed on 19 July 2023, they are:

President - David McCann

Vice President - Nikki Cragie

Vice President Finance - Derek Kehoe

Vice President Admin - Graham Sheehan

Vice President Training - Paul McLoughlin

The new board hope to overcome the insurance issues surrounding the MCI.
