= 1910 Isle of Man TT =

Annual motorcycle racing event

1910 Isle of Man Tourist Trophy

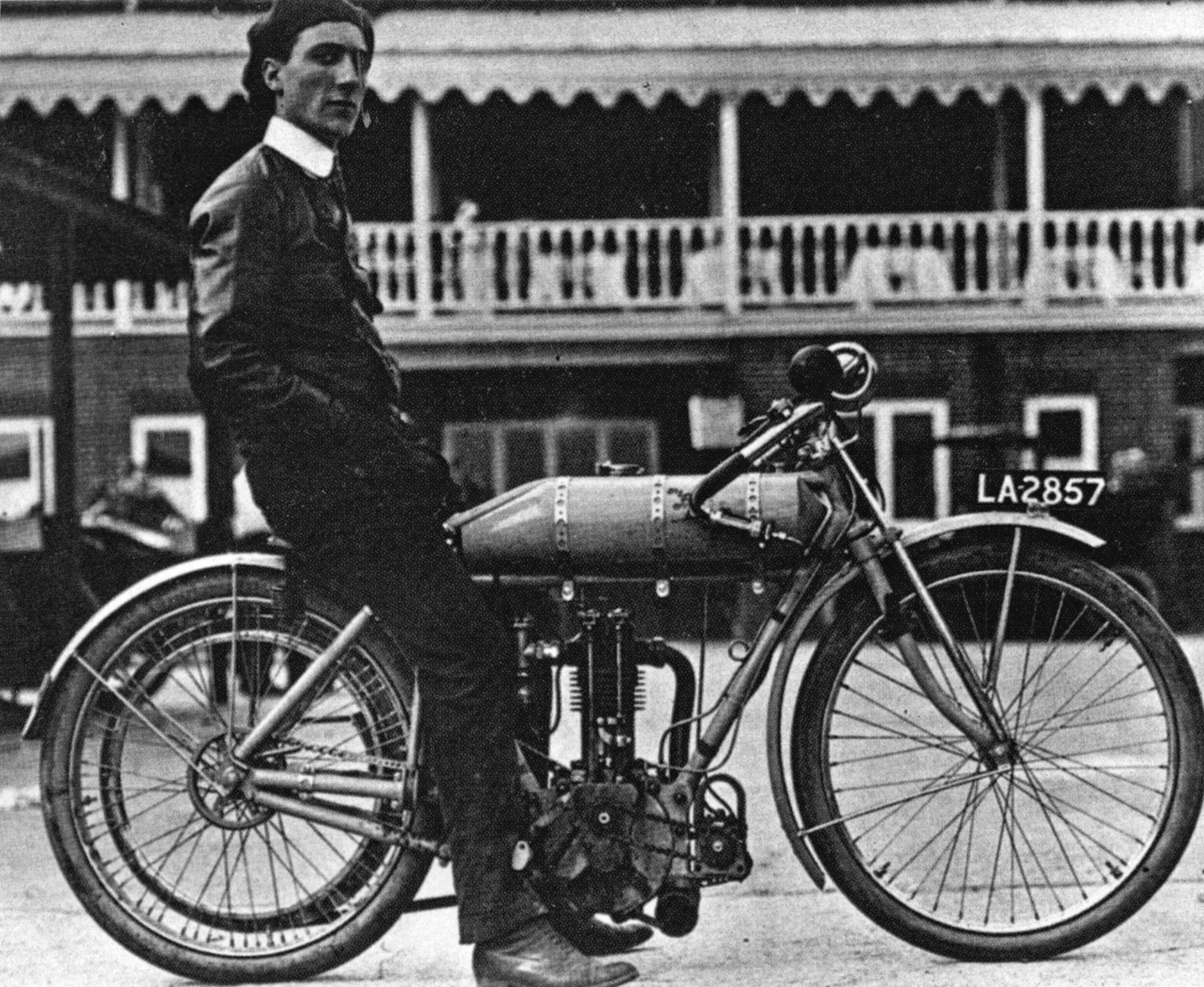
Harold Bowen on BAT-racer in 1910.
- Date: May 26, 1910
- Location: St John's, Isle of Man
- Course: St John's Short Course; 15 miles (24 km), 1,470 yards (25.49 km)
- Organiser: Auto-Cycle Union, Tynwald
- Clerk: Freddie Straight

500 Single & 670 Twin Open Class
- First: Charlie Collier, Matchless
- Second: Harry Collier, Matchless
- Third: Walter Creyton, Triumph

Fastest lap
- Harold Bowen, BAT; 17min. 51sec. 53.15 mph (New record)

The 1910 Isle of Man Tourist Trophy races took place on the Short Course (St John's, Ballacraine, Kirk Michael, Peel, St John's).

== 500cc Single & 670cc Twin Results Open Class final standings ==
Thursday 26 May 1910 – 10 laps (158 1/8 miles (254.5 km)) St John's Short Course.

(Isle of Man) The 4th International Auto-cycle Tourist Trophy

Pos	#	Rider	Bike	Cyl.	500 Single & 750 Twin Open Class race classification			
Pos	#	Rider	Bike	Cyl.	Laps	Time	Speed	Prizes & remarks
1	14	(United Kingdom) Charlie Collier	5 hp (3.7 kW) Matchless 666cc	2	10	3:07.54	50.59 mph	1st Prize - Trophy and £40
2	1	(United Kingdom) Harry Collier	5 hp (3.7 kW) Matchless 666cc	2	10	3:12.45	49.29 mph	2nd Prize - £20.
3	9	(Isle of Man) Walter Creyton	3 2/3 hp (2.7 kW) Triumph 499cc	1	10	3:17.58	48.02 mph	3rd Prize - £10
4	37	(United Kingdom) Jack Adamson	3 2/3 hp (2.7 kW) Triumph 499cc	1	10	3:21.47	47.09 mph	Silver Cup and £5 5s for the 1st Private owners' machine.
5	36	(United Kingdom) Jack Scriven	4 hp (3.0 kW) Rex 660cc	2	10	3:23.35	44.66 mph	Silver Cup and £2 2s for the 2nd Private owners' machine.
6	7	(United Kingdom) Jack Marshall	3 2/3 hp (2.7 kW) Triumph 499cc	1	10	3:24.47	46.40 mph	
7	34	(United Kingdom) Howard Lister-Cooper	3 2/3 hp (2.7 kW) Triumph	1	10	3:25.24	46.23 mph	
8	8	(United Kingdom) Billy Newsome	3 2/3 hp (2.7 kW) Triumph 499cc	1	10	3:26.35	45.98 mph	
9	31	(United Kingdom) Frank Philipp	5 hp (3.7 kW) Scott 640cc	2	10	3:31.47	44.86 mph	
10	12	(United Kingdom) Bert Colver	5 hp (3.7 kW) Matchless 666cc	2	10	3:36.46	43.83 mph	
11	39	(Republic of Ireland) Charlie Murphy	3 2/3 hp (2.7 kW) Triumph 499cc	1	10	3:37.15	43.69 mph	
12	43	(United Kingdom) Howard Smith	3 2/3 hp (2.7 kW) Triumph 499cc	1	10	3:40.15	43.10 mph	
13	27	(Scotland) Jimmy Alexander jun.	5 hp (3.7 kW) Indian 662.5cc	2	10	3:42.49	42.46 mph	
14	75	(United Kingdom) Billy Heaton	3 2/3 hp (2.7 kW) NSU 662cc	1	10	3:43.46	42.46 mph	
15	62	(United Kingdom) William McMinnies	3 2/3 hp (2.7 kW) Triumph 499cc	1	10	3:45.16	42.14 mph	
16	35	(United Kingdom) Rem Fowler	4 hp (3.0 kW) Rex 660cc	2	10	3:45.46	42.08 mph	
17	60	(United Kingdom) Jack Slaughter	3 2/3 hp (2.7 kW) Ariel 482.5cc	1	10	3:48.00	41.46 mph	
18	40	(United Kingdom) Daniel Bolton	4 hp (3.0 kW) Rex 660cc	2	10	3:51.45	40.99 mph	
19	40	(United Kingdom) J.R. Woodward	4 hp (3.0 kW) Rex 660cc	2	10	4:05.51	38.64 mph	
20	72	(United Kingdom) James Baxter	4 hp (3.0 kW) Rex 660cc	2	10	4:07.49	38.33 mph	
21	3	(United States) G. Lee Evans	5 hp (3.7 kW) Indian 662.5cc	2	10	4:09.16	34.66 mph	
22	17	(Scotland) Alfie Alexander	3 2/3 hp (2.7 kW) Rex 499cc	1	10	4:10.15	37.93 mph	
23	49	(United Kingdom) W.E. Grange	3 2/3 hp (2.7 kW) Rex 499cc	1	10	4:10.37	37.89 mph	
24	20	(United Kingdom) Eric S. Myers	5 hp (3.7 kW) Scott 640cc	2	10	4:16.50	36.99 mph	
25	86	(Isle of Man) Douglas Brown	3 2/3 hp (2.7 kW) Humber 499cc	1	10	4:17.30	36.87 mph	
26	66	(United Kingdom) S.C. Perryman	5 hp (3.7 kW) Blumfield 668cc	2	10	4:31.08	34.91 mph	
27	19	(United Kingdom) Andrew Sproston	4 hp (3.0 kW) Rex 660cc	2	10	4:35.06	34.43 mph	
28	58	(United Kingdom) Peter Weatherilt	3 2/3 hp (2.7 kW) Zenith-Gradua 482cc	1	10	4:41.53	33.70 mph	
29	65	(United Kingdom) F.W. Case	3 2/3 hp (2.7 kW) Centaur 494cc	1	10	4:45.19	33.27 mph	
Fastest lap: Harold Bowen, 17min. 51sec. 53.15 mph (New record)
