= Packman & Poppe Motorcycles =

British motorcycle manufacturer

Packman & Poppe
- Industry: Manufacturing and engineering
- Founded: 1922
- Defunct: 1930
- Fate: Wound up
- Headquarters: Coventry, UK
- Key people: Erling Poppe and Gilmour Packman
- Products: Motorcycles

Packman & Poppe (P&P) was a British motorcycle manufacturer. Founded by Erling Poppe and Gilmour Packman the first motorcycle was produced in 1922 with a 250 cc (15 cu in) two-stroke engine. This was followed by a 976 cc (59.6 cu in) side-valve machine with a JAP V-twin engine in 1923 and the Silent Three using a 350 cc (21 cu in) Barr and Stroud sleeve-valve engine. Packman & Poppe entered three machines in the 1925 Isle of Man TT. Packman was injured in an argument with a salesman and died. In the same year the Packman & Poppe factory was destroyed by a fire and in 1926 sold to John Wooler, who kept up production until the Depression, in 1930.
