= Academy for Jewish Religion (California) =

Jewish seminary in Los Angeles, CA, USA

Academy for Jewish Religion California
- Type: Seminary
- Established: 2000
- Affiliations: Jewish (nondenominational)
- Location: Los Angeles, California, United States; 34.0702°N 118.4384°W
- Website: ajrca.edu

The Academy for Jewish Religion California (AJRCA), is a Jewish seminary in Los Angeles. It trains rabbis, cantors and chaplains to serve congregations and organizations of any Jewish denomination.

== History ==
The school was conceived as a transdenominational alternative to the more established rabbinical schools by two Los Angeles rabbis, Stanley Levy and Stephen Robbins, later joined by a third, Mordecai Finley, who became president of the school soon after its establishment in 2001. Initially conceived as a branch of the New York City-based Academy for Jewish Religion, it soon became independent.

In its first years the school was housed in a small temple in West Los Angeles, later moving to the Yitzchak Rabin Hillel Center for Jewish Life at UCLA. It ordained its first three rabbis in 2003, and provided a means for students to pursue rabbinical studies while still working in other jobs.

In 2010 the school partnered with Claremont School of Theology (CST) to provide a Jewish component for CST's interfaith curriculum. In January 2013 Tamar Frankiel became the president of the Academy for Jewish Religion, making her the first Orthodox woman to lead an American rabbinical school. The school itself is transdenominational, not Orthodox. Later in 2013, the Academy relocated from UCLA to a building in Koreatown shared with two other Jewish organizations. The Academy returned "home", to UCLA Hillel in the fall of 2017, and in 2021 it moved to the campus of Loyola Marymount University. In 2022 Rabbi Joshua Hoffman was named as the president and CEO of the Academy.

In 2025 the school ordained Jenni Asher, making her the first Black American woman ever ordained as a cantor.

== Building ==
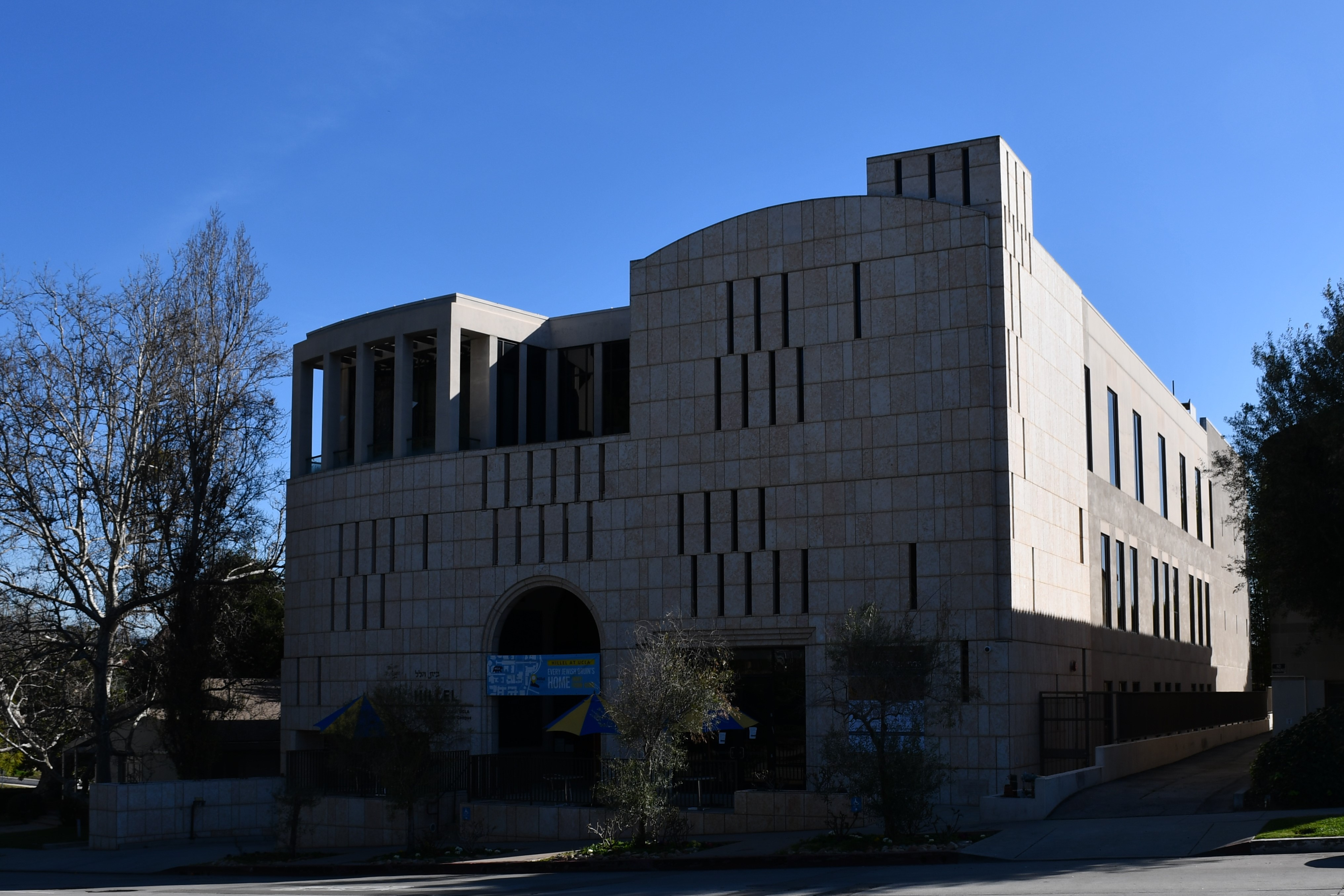
Yitzhak Rabin Hillel Center for Jewish Life

The Yitzchak Rabin Hillel Center for Jewish Life is a center for Jewish cultural, religious and spiritual education at the University of California, Los Angeles. The Hillel has been home to the Academy since the new building was dedicated in 2002.
