= Charlie Collier =

British motorcycle racer

- Collier at the start of the 1913 ISDT motorcycle trial event
- Nationality: English
- Born: 1883
- Died: 1954 (aged 70–71)
Motorcycle racing career statistics
Isle of Man TT career
TTs contested	8 (1907–1914)
TT wins	2
First TT win	1907 Single Cylinder TT
Last TT win	1910 500 Single and 750 Twin TT
TT podiums	3

Charles Richard Collier (1885–1954) of Plumstead, London, was a British motorcycle racer famous for winning Isle of Man TT races twice in his career. After competing in the 1906 International Cup Races on the European continent, he became the first Isle of Man TT race winner in 1907.

Along with his brother Harry, Charlie raced Matchless motorcycles manufactured by their father's company, H.Collier & Sons.

After setting a number of world motorcycle records on Matchless machines, Collier won another Isle of Man TT race in 1910 and later became the first competitor to be disqualified from a race for illegal refuelling. He later became a joint managing director of AJS and Matchless motorcycles and died in 1954.

== Racing career ==
Collier's first race was in 1902 at the 3½ mile Canning Town cycling track, riding a Matchless motorcycle with an MMC engine. After leading until the last lap, he crashed due to a burst tyre and suffered friction abrasions.

In 1905, along with his brother Harry, Collier participated in the eliminating trial for the International Motor Cycle Cup held on a 25-mile section of the Gordon Bennett Trial course on the Isle of Man. Although Harry managed to qualify, the Matchless motorcycle with a JAP engine which Charlie had specially built suffered a broken connecting-rod and was forced to retire.

After racing in the 1906 International Cup, both brothers were unhappy with the relatively low imposed weight limit of 110 lbs, causing sacrifices in frame and tyre strength to be made to compensate for the heavy engines.

They entered a new event the following year, the 1907 Isle of Man TT for single and twin-cylinder road-touring motorcycles held on the St John's Short Course. Charlie won the single cylinder-class on a Matchless in 4 hours, 8 minutes and 8 seconds at an average race speed of 38.21 mph. Harry, also riding a Matchless, had problems with an engine seizure on lap 2 and eventually retired on lap 9.

== TT race achievements ==
=== TT Single Cylinder race ===
Tuesday 28 May 1907 - 10 laps (158.00 miles) St John's Short Course.

Position	Number	Rider	Team	Speed	Time
1	4	(United Kingdom) Charlie Collier	3½ hp Matchless	38.21 mph	4:08.08.2
2	2	(United Kingdom) Jack Marshall	3½ hp Triumph	36.60	4:19.47.3
3	1	(United Kingdom) Frank Hulbert	3½ hp Triumph	35.50	4:27.49.4

=== TT Race Victories ===
Year	Race & Capacity	Motorcycle	Average Speed
1907	Single-Cylinder	Matchless	38.21 mph
1910	500 cc Single & 750 cc Twin-Cylinder	Matchless	50.63 mph

=== TT career summary ===
Finishing Position	1st	2nd	4th	DNF
Number of times	2	1	1	4
