= Motorcycle Union of Ireland =

All-Ireland motorcycling governing body

The Motorcycle Union of Ireland (MCUI) is the governing body of motorcycle sport on the island of Ireland.

The MCUI consists of three bodies that are affiliated to the Fédération Internationale de Motocyclisme (International Motorcycling Federation). The three constituents which make up the Motor Cycle Union of Ireland are: Motorcycling Ireland (MCUI SC), the Motor Cycle Union of Ireland (Ulster Centre) and the Motorcycle Racing Association (MRA).

The MCUI has jurisdiction in all questions relating to the sport of tarmac and trials motorcycling within Ireland.
