= Rem Fowler =

British motorcycle racer (1882-1963)

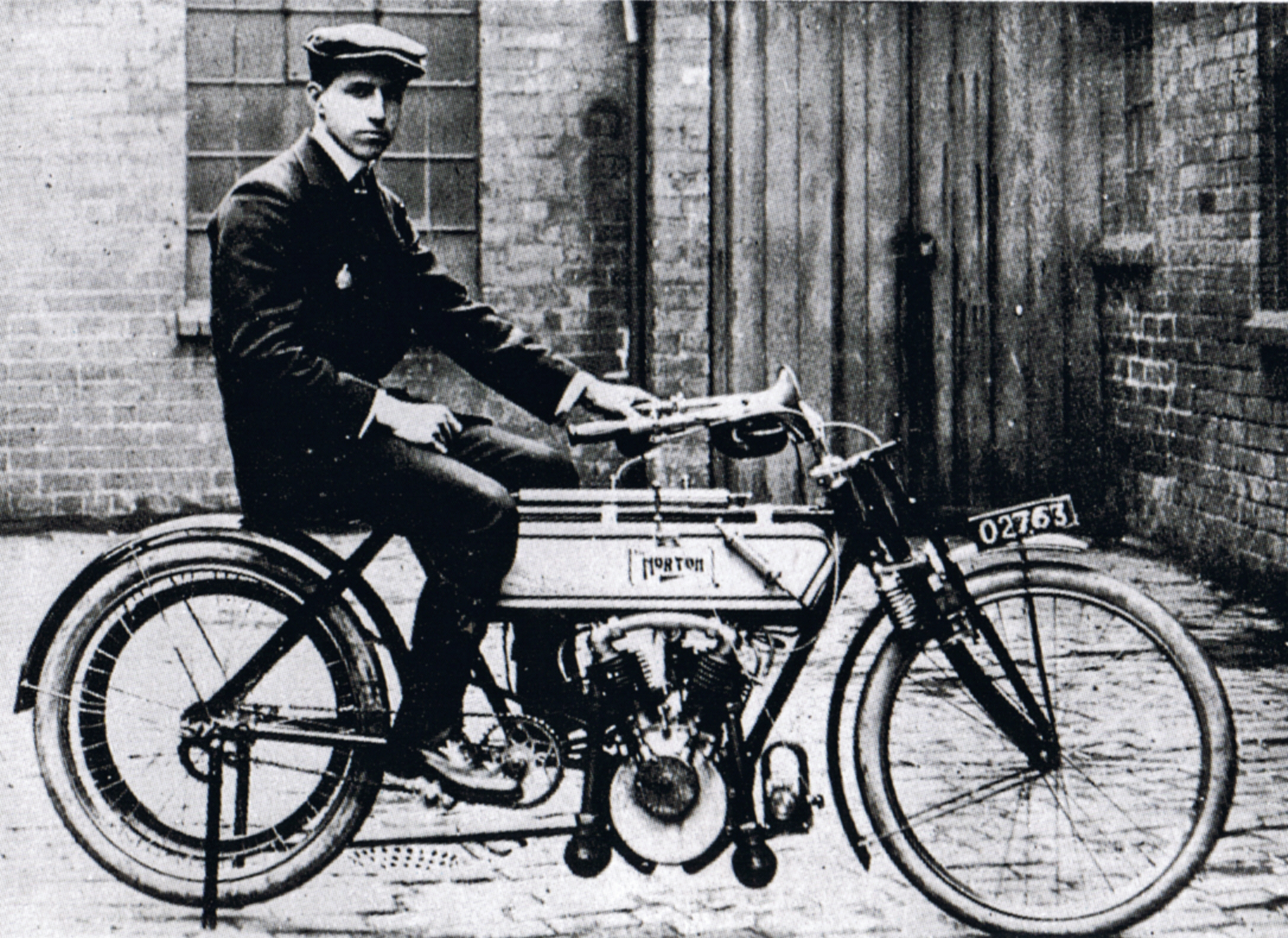
- Fowler on his Peugeot-engined Norton, winner of the 1907 TT twin-cylinder race
- Nationality: British
- Born: 1882
- Died: 1963 aged 80
Motorcycle racing career statistics
Isle of Man TT career
TTs contested	5 (1907-1911)
TT wins	1
First TT win	1907 Twin Cylinder TT
Last TT win	1907 Twin Cylinder TT
TT podiums	1

Harry Rembrandt 'Rem' Fowler (1882 – 1963 in Birmingham, England) was a British motorcycle racer famous for winning the twin-cylinder class of the inaugural 1907 Isle of Man TT races

A skilled toolmaker by trade, Fowler competed as a trials rider between 1903 and 1923 riding Ariel, New Hudson, and Rex motor-cycles and entered the first Isle of Man TT race riding a 5 hp Peugeot-engined Norton motorcycle.

During the First World War, Fowler was involved in the calibration of gun-sights and during World War II worked in tool-making in the aero-engine industry.

After the war, as a frequent visitor to the TT races every year, Fowler was presented with a Gold Medal along with former TT race winner Jack Marshall at the 1957 Golden Jubilee TT races.

Fowler died in Solihull Hospital on 13 February 1963 at age 80 having retired from work in November 1962.

== Twin Cylinder Race ==
Tuesday 28 May 1907 – 10 laps (158.00 miles) St John's Short Course.

Rank	No	Rider	Team	Speed	Time
1	22	(United Kingdom) Rem Fowler	5 hp Norton	36.21 mph	4:21.52.8
2	21	(United Kingdom) W.H. 'Billy' Wells	5 hp Vindec	32.30	4:53.44.5
3	26	(United Kingdom) W.M.Heaton	5 hp Rex	30.50	4:27.49.4

=== TT career summary ===
Finishing Position	1st	16th	19th	DNF
Number of times	1	2	1	2
