= Dot Cycle and Motor Manufacturing Company =

British motorcycle manufacturing company

- Industry: Motorcycles
- Founded: 1903
- Founder: Harry Reed
- Defunct: 1978, relaunched 2021
- Headquarters: Bolton, Greater Manchester, United Kingdom
- Key people: Dr. Anthony Keating (CEO)
- Website: https://dotmotorcycles.co.uk/

The Dot Cycle and Motor Manufacturing Company was a British motorcycle manufacturer. The company was established in 1903 by Harry Reed in Salford, Lancashire, a city near Manchester. By 1906 they had built their first motorcycle, using a Peugeot engine.

== History ==
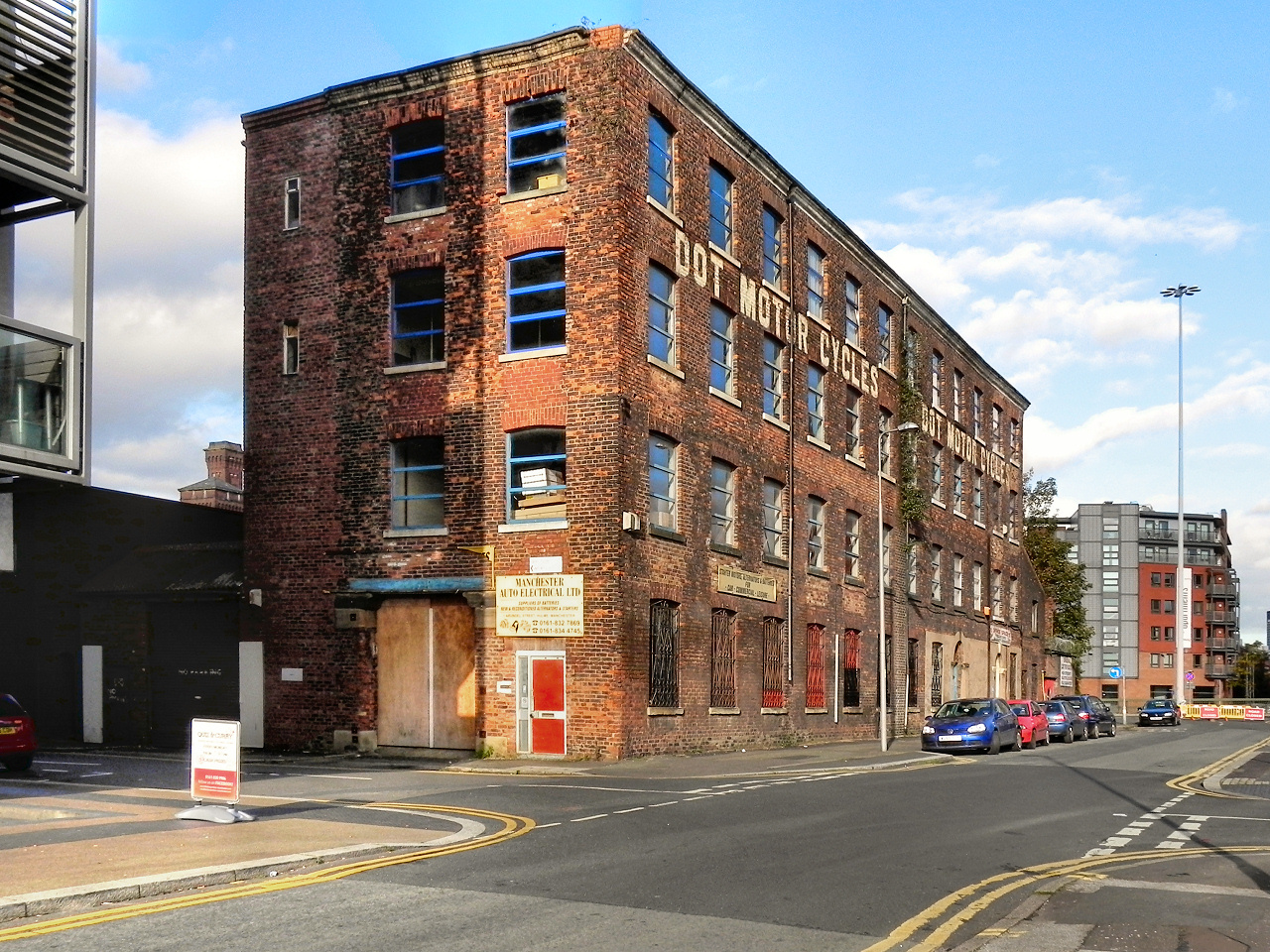
The old Dot Motorcycle Works, Ellesmere Street, Castlefield, Manchester

=== Harry Reed years (1903–1926) ===
Dot Motorcycles were a northern manufacturer founded by Harry Reed in the pioneering days of motorcycling, famed for a succession of sporting machines which gave many a clubman the opportunity to ride on a competitive basis with every prospect of success. Reed was initially involved with the manufacture and sale of pedal cycles in Salford, and the early association with motorcycles is unclear, although he won an international motorcycle sprint at Blackpool in 1906 on a "Swallow-Peugeot" and is recorded on a "Dreadnought" before the first mention of Dot motorcycles in 1907, by which time the company had relocated to larger premises in nearby Manchester. It was on a Dot motorcycle that Reed competed in the first motorcycle races at Brooklands in 1908 and, in September 1908, won the Twin Cylinder Class in the Isle of Man TT beating international competition from larger and better-established manufacturers. Although Dot never repeated that TT win, there was considerable success in the TT and other road racing events over the next 20 years. Reed actively rode in top-level competition until 1924, when he took part in the sidecar event at the Isle of Man TT meeting.

=== Depression and World War II (1932–1945) ===
In 1932 motorcycle production ceased, and did not resume until 1949. Contract engineering work allowed the firm to survive.

=== Burnard Scott Wade years (1932–1984) ===
In 1920 Thomas Sawyer joined the business. After Reed's departure from the company in 1925, Sawyer oversaw further success for the Dot marque in competition, but with the onset of the 1930s depression production slowed and ceased in 1932.

Sawyer passed control of the company to a young Burnard Scott Wade, who kept the company going through the 1930s with a line of pedal-powered 3-wheel delivery trucks developed for the niche markets of milk-delivery and ice cream vending. With the onset of World War II the government awarded Dot a contract for the production of these economical delivery vehicles, which were shipped around the world. During the tedious "fire watching" duty during the Manchester Blitz, Wade sketched out ideas for a similar vehicle powered by a small two-stroke engine, and successfully developed this into the Dot Motor Truck, which could be produced in various guises to meet the market for a cheap, powered delivery vehicle. Such was the demand that a profitable Dot Company was able to re-enter the motorcycle market in 1949 with a utilitarian two-stroke machine with a 200 cc Villiers engine which sold well in the export market. Many exist today in Scandinavia, Canada, and Australia.

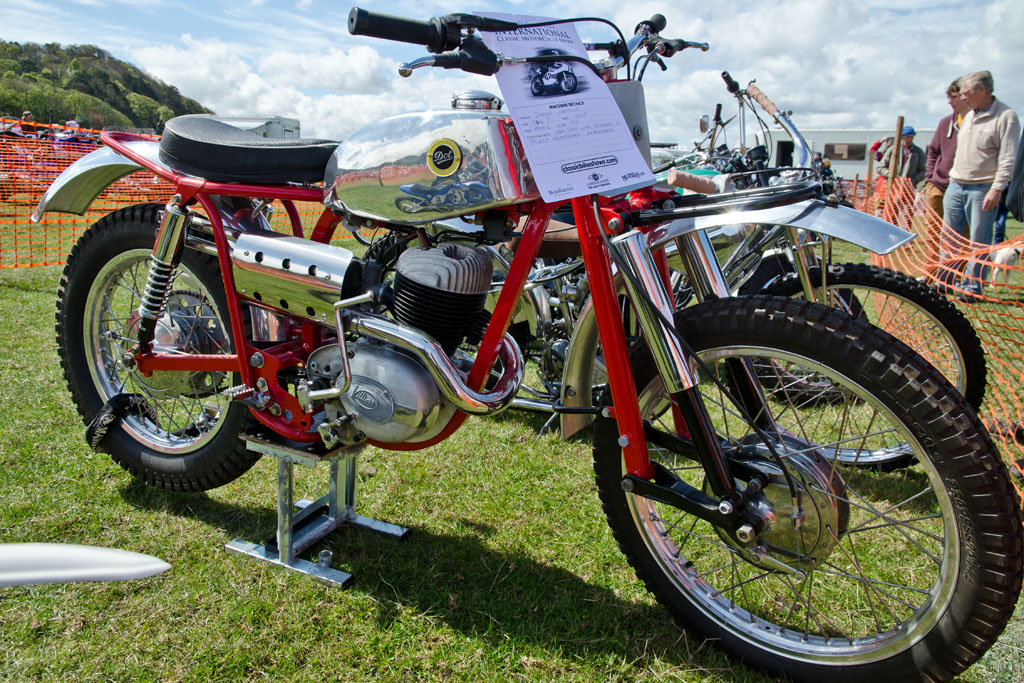
1964 Dot trials model

The temptation for Dot to produce a sporting machine was strong, and Wade developed a small, cheap 2-stroke machine which could be ridden on the road on an everyday basis, but with minor alternations such as removing the lights, could compete in scrambles and trials events. The "Trials Scrambler" was introduced in 1951, and in a short time riders of the calibre of Bill Barugh and Terry Cheshire and hundreds of club riders had realised that such nimble lightweight machines had the beating of the larger machines previously predominant in the sport, and ushered in the modern lightweight competition bikes.

By coincidence, 1951 was the year that the Dot founder Harry Reed died. Dot also put some effort into developing a lightweight road racing machine, again entering the TT and won the team award in the 1951 Ultra Lightweight 125 cc TT, the only such win by a British manufacturer. However, the real demand was for trials and scrambles, and throughout the fifties and into the early sixties Dot were a considerable force in scrambles and trials events. Dot was dominant in both the top events with works riders such as Eric Adcock, Jonnie Griffiths, Ernie Greer and Pat Lamper and in many local events where the ordinary clubman could afford to ride similar machines to those campaigned by a factory team.

Eventually, Dot found it increasingly difficult to compete with the larger motorcycle manufacturers. Further, the demise of their main engine supplier, Villiers, and the increasing number of foreign imports, spelled the end of large scale production. Burnard Wade developed and marketed motor cycle suspension units, sold spares and undertook general engineering work to keep the company viable, but always hoped to return to motorcycle manufacture. In 1978 he revealed a new design of machine for clubman use, but few were built, as the time had passed when a small factory like Dot could compete against the large Japanese mass producers.

=== Aftermath ===
The Dot factory still exists at Ellesmere Street, opposite St. George's Church in Hulme, Manchester, and the company produces and sells a range of spares for postwar machines. The Dot Motorcycle Club actively caters for owners and enthusiasts, publishes a magazine, and attends most major classic motorcycle events. Much of the material for this article comes from Devoid of Trouble, the history of Dot Motorcycles written by the Official Dot historian, Ted Hardy.

Michael Scott Wade died on 14 September 2010, and thus ended the Scott Wade era for Dot Motorcycles started in 1932 with Burnard Scott Wade.

=== Present and future ===
A 2017 planning application for residential redevelopment of the site to include a tower block was refused in 2018. An amended application was submitted in 2019. The planning committee was "minded to approve", subject to certain conditions.

In 2021, Dot Motorcycles was relaunched with Guy Martin's help, still based in Greater Manchester, but now in Bolton.
