= Allright (automobile) =

German automobile

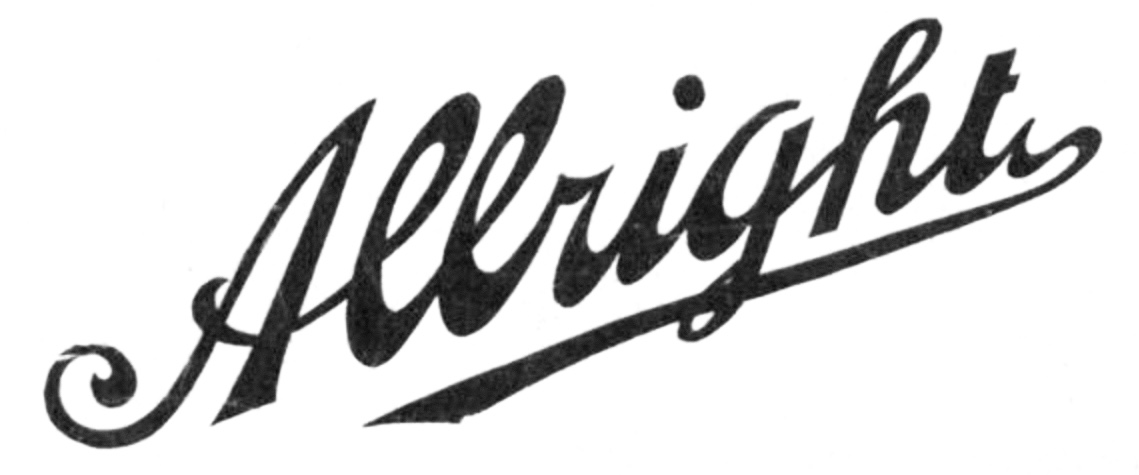
- Industry: Automotive
- Founded: 1890; 136 years ago
- Founder: Georg Sorge
- Defunct: 1965; 61 years ago
- Headquarters: Cologne, Germany
- Products: Cars, bicycles, motorcycles

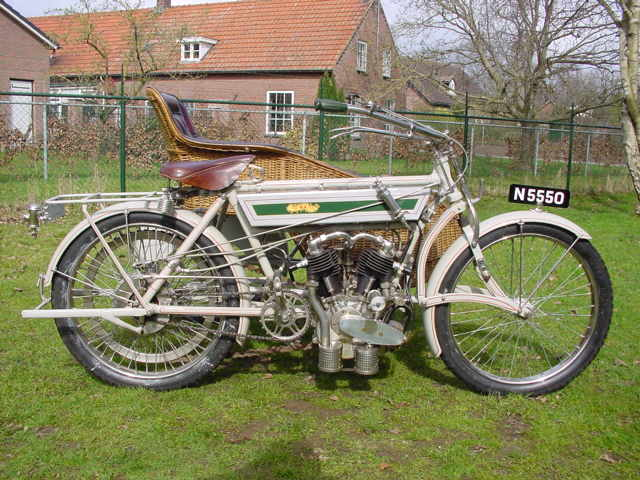
Allright

The Allright (known in Germany as the Allreit and outside of Germany as the Vindec-Special) was a German automobile manufactured from 1908 to 1913 at the Cologne-Lindenthal factory that produced Allright, Tiger, Roland, and Vindec-Special bicycles and motorcycles.

The first Allright-Mobil of 1908 was offered with an air-cooled 5 hp (3.7 kW) v-twin engine and four wire wheels. It weighed 200 kg (440 lb) and could reach 35 km/h (22 mph).

From 1910 an improved model was offered, available as two-seater Runabout or delivery truck. Its 960 cc v-twin engine delivered 7 hp (5.2 kW) at 1300 rpm. A rear-wheel-drive vehicle, its axle was driven via a conical leather clutch, a three-speed transmission, and chains. The vehicle weighed 500 kg (1,100 lb) and could attain a speed of 55 km/h (34 mph). It was sold for 3,000 German gold marks.

== Vindec-Special ==
In 1906 the Motor Cycling Club's gold medal was awarded to those who could complete the 391-mile journey from London to Edinburgh in under 24 hours. The fastest finisher was Tom Woodman (22h 38m) riding a 5-horsepower Vindec-Special motor-bicycle. W. H. 'Billy' Wells in second was also riding a Vindec-Special.

Vindec-Specials were also placed in the 1907 Isle of Man TT Twin Cylinder race, Billy Wells coming second and Arnold Dent fourth.
