= AJR (motorcycle) =

Motorcycle built in Scotland

- Production: 1925–1926
- Class: Motorcycle
- Engine: 346 cc, 490 cc Villiers single-cylinder

The AJR was one of the few motorcycles built in Scotland. AJ Robertson of Edinburgh built 346 cc and 490 cc Villiers powered single cylinder engine machines between 1925 and 1926. Robertson rode them in many sporting events.
