= St John's Short Course =

Road racing circuit on the Isle of Man

- Location: St John's, Isle of Man
- Major events: Isle of Man TT
- Length: 25.51 km (15.85 mi)
- Turns: 45+
- Race lap record: 17 minutes 51 seconds (H.H.Bowen, BAT, 1910)

The St John's Short Course was a road-racing street circuit used for the Isle of Man TT held between 1907 and 1910.

The races were run in a time-trial format on public roads closed for racing by an Act of Tynwald (the parliament of the Isle of Man) around a circuit starting from the village of St John's, proceeding through Ballacraine, Kirk Michael, Peel and back to St John's.

The first motorcycle race was held on 28 May 1907 over 10 laps of the Short Course of 27,870 yards (15.84 mi; 25.48 km) and was for road-legal touring motor-cycles with exhaust silencers, saddles, pedals and mud-guards.

The startline was situated in St John's with the Short Course based on a number of public roads including the primary A1 Douglas to Peel road, A3 Castletown to Ramsey road and the primary A4 Peel to Kirk Michael Coast Road. The highest point of the course was on the primary A3 Castletown to Ramsey Road at St John's Chapelon the Cronk-y-Voddy straight at 780 ft (240 m) above sea level.54°14′27″N 4°36′23″W

== History ==
Motor racing began on the Isle of Man in 1904 with the Gordon Bennett Trial and was originally restricted to touring cars. As the UK Motor Car Act 1903 of Parliament placed a mainland speed restriction of 20 mph (32 km/h) on cars, the Secretary of the Automobile Car Club of Britain and Ireland approached the authorities in the Isle of Man for the permission to race cars on public roads. The Highways (Light Locomotive) Act 1904 gave permission in the Isle of Man for the 52.15-mile (83.93 km) Highlands Course for the 1904 Gordon Bennett Trial.

For the 1905 Gordon Bennett Car event it was decided to run a trial for motorcycles the day after for a team to represent Great Britain in the International Motor Cycle Cup Races. An accident at Ramsey Hairpin forced-out one of the pre-race favourites and the inability of the motorcycle competitors to climb the steep Mountain Section of the course forced the organisers to use a 25-mile (40 km) section of the Gordon Bennett Trial course. This ran from Douglas using the primary A5 Douglas to Port Erin road to Castletown, from Castletown to Ballacraine using the A3 Castletown to Ramsey Road and returned to the start at the Quarterbridge in Douglas via Crosby and Glen Vine along the current Snaefell Mountain Course in the reverse direction using the A1 Douglas to Peel road.

During the 1906 International Cup for Motor Cycles held in Austria, the event was plagued by accusations of cheating and sharp practices. During a conversation on the train journey home between the Secretary of the Auto-Cycle Club, Freddie Straight, brothers Charlie Collier and Harry Collier of Matchless Motor Cycles and the Marquis de Mouzilly St. Mars lead to a suggestion for a race the following year for road touring motorcycles based on the car races held in the Isle of Man on closed public roads. The new race was proposed by the Editor of "The Motor Cycle" magazine at the annual dinner of the Auto-Cycle Club held in London on 17 January 1907. It was proposed that the races would be run in two classes, with single-cylinder machines to average 90 mpg and twin-cylinder machines to average 75 mpg fuel consumption. To emphasise the road-touring nature of the motorcycles there were regulations for saddles, pedals, mudguards and exhaust silencers.

=== First Race 1907 ===
The 1907 Tourist Trophy was the first of the Isle of Man TT races. The races took place on 28 May 1907 over the St John's Short Course. The race was ten laps of the 15-mile (24 km) 1,430-yard (1,310 m) course, a total of 158 1/8 miles (254.5 km).

On Tuesday 28 May 1907, pairs of riders from the 25 entrants started together using a time-trial format. The race for the single cylinder-class was won by Charles R.Collier riding a Matchless motorcycle in 4 hours, 8 minutes and 8 seconds at an average race speed of 38.21 miles per hour (61.49 km/h). His brother, Harry Collier also riding a Matchless motorcycle had problems with an engine seizure on lap 2 and eventually retired on lap 9.

=== 1907 Single Cylinder TT Race ===
Tuesday 28 May 1907 – 10 laps (158 1/8 miles [254.5 km]) – Short Course.

Rank	No	Rider	Team	Speed	Time
1	4	(United Kingdom) Charlie Collier	3 2/3 hp (2.7 kW) Matchless	38.21 mph (61.49 km/h)	4:08.08.2
2	2	(United Kingdom) Jack Marshall	3 2/3 hp (2.7 kW) Triumph	36.60 mph (58.90 km/h)	4:19.47.3
3	1	(United Kingdom) Frank Hulbert	3 2/3 hp (2.7 kW) Triumph	35.50 mph (57.13 km/h)	4:27.49.4

The 1907 Twin-Cylinder class and overall race was initially led by Rem Fowler riding a Norton motor-cycle. The overall lead fell away as Rem Fowler suffered a number of problems with drive belts and spark plugs and on lap 7 crashed at nearly 60 mph (97 km/h) due to a burst tyre at the "Devil's Elbow" on the Kirk Michael to Peel section of the course. Fowler nearly gave up, but was told by a spectator that he led the twin-cylinder class by 30 minutes from Billy Wells and went on to win at an average race speed of 36.22 mph (58.29 km/h) and set the fastest lap of the race at 42.91 mph (69.06 km/h), winning a cash prize of £25.

=== 1907 Twin-Cylinder TT Race ===
Tuesday 28 May 1907 – 10 laps (158 1/8 miles (254.5 km)) – Short Course.

Rank	No	Rider	Team	Speed	Time
1		(United Kingdom) Rem Fowler	Norton-Peugeot	36.21 mph (58.27 km/h)	4:21.52.8
2		(United Kingdom) W.H. 'Billy' Wells	Vindec	32.30 mph (51.98 km/h)	4:53.44.5
3		(United Kingdom) W.M.Heaton	Rex	30.50 mph (49.08 km/h)	5:11.03.5

For the 1908 race the fuel consumption was raised to 100 mpg for single-cylinder machines and 80 mpg for twin-cylinder machines and the use of pedals was banned. The race was won by Jack Marshall on a Triumph motorcycle at an average speed of 40.49 mph (65.16 km/h). For the 1909 event the fuel consumption regulations was abandoned along with the use of exhaust silencers. The single-cylinder machines where limited to a capacity of 500cc and the twins to a 750cc engine capacity. Due to the concern over increasing lap-speed, the 1910 event saw the capacity of the twin-cylinder machines reduced to 670cc. However, Harry Bowen riding a BAT twin-cylinder motor-cycle increased the lap record to an average speed of 53.15 mph (85.54 km/h), later crashing-out on the wooden banking at Ballacraine.
