= Academy for Jewish Religion (New York) =

The Academy for Jewish Religion (AJR) is a rabbinical school based in Yonkers, New York, founded on a pluralistic approach to Judaism. The rabbinical school was the first to appoint a Jewish woman as its president.

== History ==
The Academy for Jewish Religion was founded in 1956 as a rabbinical school. Initially called the Academy for Liberal Judaism (and then the Academy for Higher Jewish Learning), it was granted a charter to ordain rabbis by the Regents of the University of the State of New York.

As of 2023, there were 19 part-time faculty members and 62 students.

=== Accreditation ===
AJR is accredited by the Association of Theological Schools in the United States and Canada. It is currently the only Jewish organization out of the 280 ATS-accredited seminaries and divinity schools.
