= Auto-Cycle Union =

Governing body of motorcycle sport in Great Britain

- Sport: Motorcycling
- Founded: 1903
- Affiliation: Fédération Internationale de Motocyclisme
- Affiliation date: 1904

Official website
- www.acu.org.uk
- (United Kingdom)

The Auto-Cycle Union (ACU) is the governing body of motorcycle sport in the British Isles, including the Channel Islands and the Isle of Man, excluding Northern Ireland (Note: Motorcycle sport in Northern Ireland is governed by the Motorcycle Union of Ireland (MCUI), the All-Ireland governing body.) and the Republic of Ireland.

== History ==
The ACU was founded in 1903 with the name of the Auto-Cycle Club, as a branch of the Automobile Club of Great Britain (later to become the Royal Automobile Club). Its aim was to develop motor sport through clubs and arrange touring facilities for members. The ACU acquired its current name in 1907, the same year that the ACGB became the RAC.

From page one of the Auto-Cycle Union Official Pocket Handbook, 1964:

Auto Cycle Union: Founded in 1903 as a Branch of the Royal Automobile Club to protect the interests of Motorcyclists and to encourage the Sport and Pastime of Motorcycling, and since 1924 has existed solely for the purpose of encouraging and controlling the Sport.

In 1904 it was a founding member of the Fédération Internationale de Motocyclisme. The ACU was the controlling body of Motorcycle speedway from 1930 until 1946, when the Speedway Control Board took over, although still constituted with the ACU.

The ACU is currently (2020) administered from offices in Rugby, Warwickshire, UK.

As at January 2021, some hundreds of ACU-affiliated motorcycling clubs are listed by the ACU in 21 regions within mainland Great Britain (England, Scotland and Wales), plus 49 x 'Non-Territorial' Clubs, 6 'Recognised Associations', and 35 'Recognised Promoters'. (Note the Motorcycle Union of Ireland (MCUI) is the governing body of motorcycle sport in Ireland, consisting of three bodies within the island of Ireland, each of which is affiliated to the Fédération Internationale de Motocyclisme (International Motorcycling Federation)).

== Motorcycle sports ==
In its capacity as governing body for motorcycle sports, the ACU covers: grasstrack (track racing), enduro, motocross, road racing (Including Supermoto, Motorcycle drag racing, Motorcycle sprint racing, Hillclimbing, Pocketbike and Scooter), speedway and trials.

== Tourist Trophy (TT) Races ==
The ACC was involved in the running of the TT races from their inception. The 1911 Isle of Man TT was the first of the TT races to be organised fully by the ACU.

== Safety ==
For many years (circa 1947-1982), with the RAC, the ACU ran a motorcycling training scheme for motorcyclist road users, which was the precursor to the modern Compulsory Basic Training courses.

For motorcycle racing, the ACU stipulates that a race competitor training course and a basic rider assessment must be passed before a Road Race Competition Licence is issued.

The ACU also governs the safety standards for personal protection equipment worn during racing. Only motorcycle helmets which meet ACU standards and display the appropriate ACU sticker can be worn in 'speed' competitions.
