= Rex-Acme =

British motorcycle manufacturer

Rex, Rex Motorcycles, Rex-Acme, (not to be confused with the German manufacturer of similar name) was a car and motorcycle company which began in Birmingham, England in 1900. Rex soon merged with a Coventry maker of bicycles and cars named Allard and then later in 1922 the company merged with Coventry's 'Acme' motorcycle company forming 'Rex Acme'. The company existed until 1933, and, in its heyday, was considered one of the greatest names in the British motorcycle industry.

== Company History ==
William Williamson formed the Birmingham Motor Manufacturing and Supply Co in mid-1901. William was described as having entered the motor trade a few years before and as being well known in racing circles, and was an ex-winner of the Catford Hill-Climb (on a bicycle). The firm used the Rex trademark for their light car, and for their 1.75 hp Rex motorcycle. They had their registered office at 189 Broad Street, Birmingham, but their works was in Coventry.

In March 1902 the assets and goodwill of the company were bought by Allard & Co, founded in 1889 by Frederick W. Allard and George Pilkington, who had made a motor tricycle and a light car but had originally manufactured bicycles. In June 1902 they changed their name to the Rex Motor Manufacturing Co. Ltd. of Osborne Road, Earlsdon, Coventry. They enlarged the factory, and produced a range of three and four wheel cars and motorcycles. The founders fell out with the board and left the company in 1911.

In 1919 Rex Motor Manufacturing Co. merged with Coventry Acme, and by 1921 the two companies were selling Rex-Acme motorcycles. Wal Handley then raced Rex-Acme motorcycles, making them famous, and even became a company director, but left in 1928 to ride different machinery. Handley rode Blackburne 173 cc singles, and, in 1926, ohv 498 cc V twins. The name began to fade, and in 1932 was taken over by side-car manufacturers, Mills-Fullford, who ceased manufacture of Rex-Acme motorcycles in 1933. Other famous motorcycle racers that rode Rex-Acme motorcycles were H. G. Tyrell Smith, Arthur Taylor, Charles Needham, Hans Hasenauer, Felice Bonetto, Karl Machu and Otto Cecconi.

== Rex Cars and Tricars ==
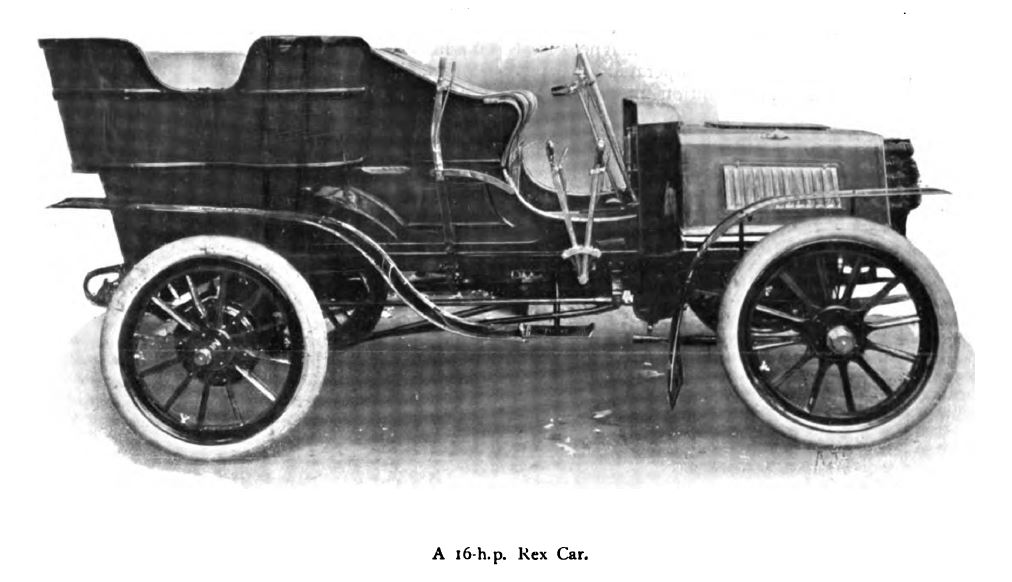
The 1903 16hp Rex Car

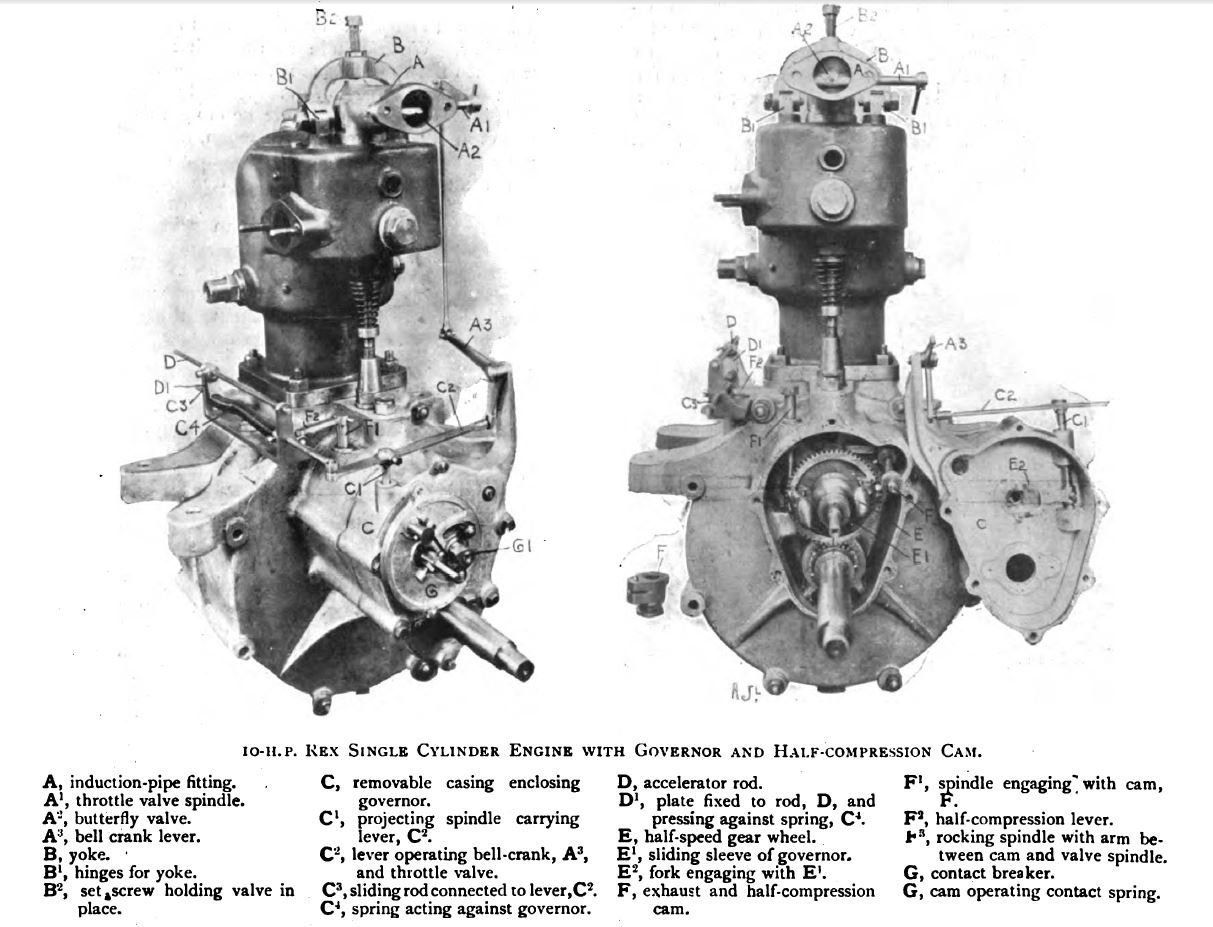
The 10hp Rex motor used in their 1903 cars

The "Rex King of British Motor Cars" was exhibited on Stand 20 at the 1901 Crystal Palace motor show. This was a 6.5HP 4-seater, but over the next year there were successive power increases and by the Spring 1903 exhibition at the Agricultural Halls the car was available with up to 16HP. Their display also showed the 10HP engine, a water-cooled single of their own making with automatic inlet valve.

In May 1904 the Rexette arrived in the showrooms, marketed as the "King of Little Cars", it was a 5HP tricar with tandem seating with the driver at the back powered through a single rear wheel.

== Rex Motorcycles (1902 - 1922) ==
The Rex Motorcycle was advertised in 1902 as King of Motor Bicycles, challenges any Motor Bicycle in the World of whatever HP weighing under 100 lbs for speed, hill-climbing and economy.

Around 1903 Rex produced motorcycles with engines above and driving, the front wheel. (the Werner engine position). The engines were Rex’s own, and included singles and V twins. In 1904 there was a 372 cc model which had the silencer cast with the cylinder in one piece. In 1905 the side valve Rex model was rated at 3.25 hp. In 1907 they introduced the Rex Lightweight with a new frame design, the engine was 76mm bore by 80mm stroke (362cc), with automatic inlet valve, and direct belt drive. At the 1908 Stanley Show both 3.5HP single and 5HP twin motorcycles were on show (both with automatic inlet valves), the 5HP with 2-speed gear. For the 1909 show they introduced a 2-stroke with the same bore and stroke as their single, and a pair of 'Speed King' motorcycles, versions of their single and V-twins fitted with rigid frame, unsprung forks, and direct belt drive.

Later they used Blackburne engines of 532 cc and 896 cc with Roc patent gear hubs. When the company fired the founders in 1911, George Hemingway had in house engines made again, but models with other engines were still built. Rex made their first telescopic forks in 1906, used rotary-valve engines, and in 1908 were the first to put a downward angle on the top tube, lowering the riding position. In 1914 there was a 349 cc two stroke and 940 cc V twins.

Muriel Hind, sometimes referred to as "the first woman motorcyclist in England" became a demonstrator, works and test rider for Rex and by 1910 they had created the Blue Devil for her, named as it was "the devil's own job" to start, and inspiring the company to paint a blue devil on the petrol tank.

After the First World War, the first bike, a 550 cc sv single, was soon dropped in favour of new Blackburne engined machines. These had a longer wheelbase sidecar version available. The singles now had 499 cc, the V twins 998 cc.

== Rex Acme (1922 - 1933) ==
In the years that followed Rex-Acme motorcycles used engines from 173 cc to 746 cc. There were sv and ohv Blackburne engines, sv JAP engines and also a sleeve valve 348 cc Barr & Stroud. In 1928 there was a 346 cc ohv MAG engined model.

The 1929 Rex-Acme range consisted of 346 cc ohv models with two JAP versions, one with 74 mm bore x 80 mm stroke and the other with 70 mm bore x 90 mm stroke; also available as double port engines; 746 cc JAP engined V twin; 496 cc sv singles with JAP or Blackburne engines; 300 cc sv singles with cheaper frames and JAP or Blackburne engines and also similar 346 cc versions., the Speed King with 346 cc Blackburne ohv engines in two versions; and also two versions of a 496 cc Blackburne engined ohv single. There was also a 172 cc Villiers engined super sports model.

In the following years, Rex-Acme also fitted MAG and Sturmey-Archer engines.

== See also ==
- Williamson Flat Twin
- List of car manufacturers of the United Kingdom
