= Bray Hill =

Road in the Isle of Man

Coordinates: 54°09′42″N 4°29′23″W

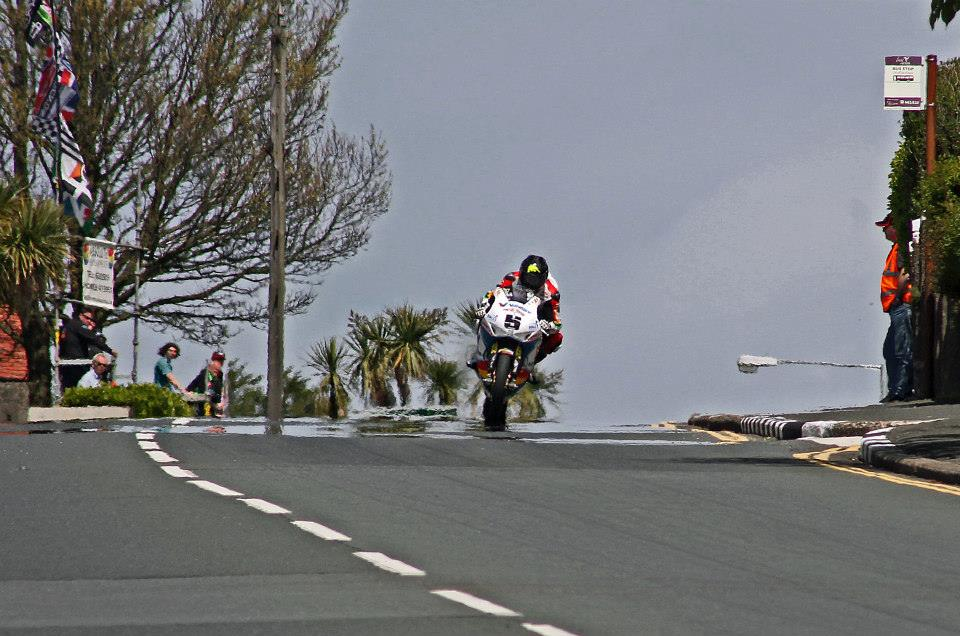
Bruce Anstey crests Bray Hill on the sixth lap of the 2015 Superbike TT

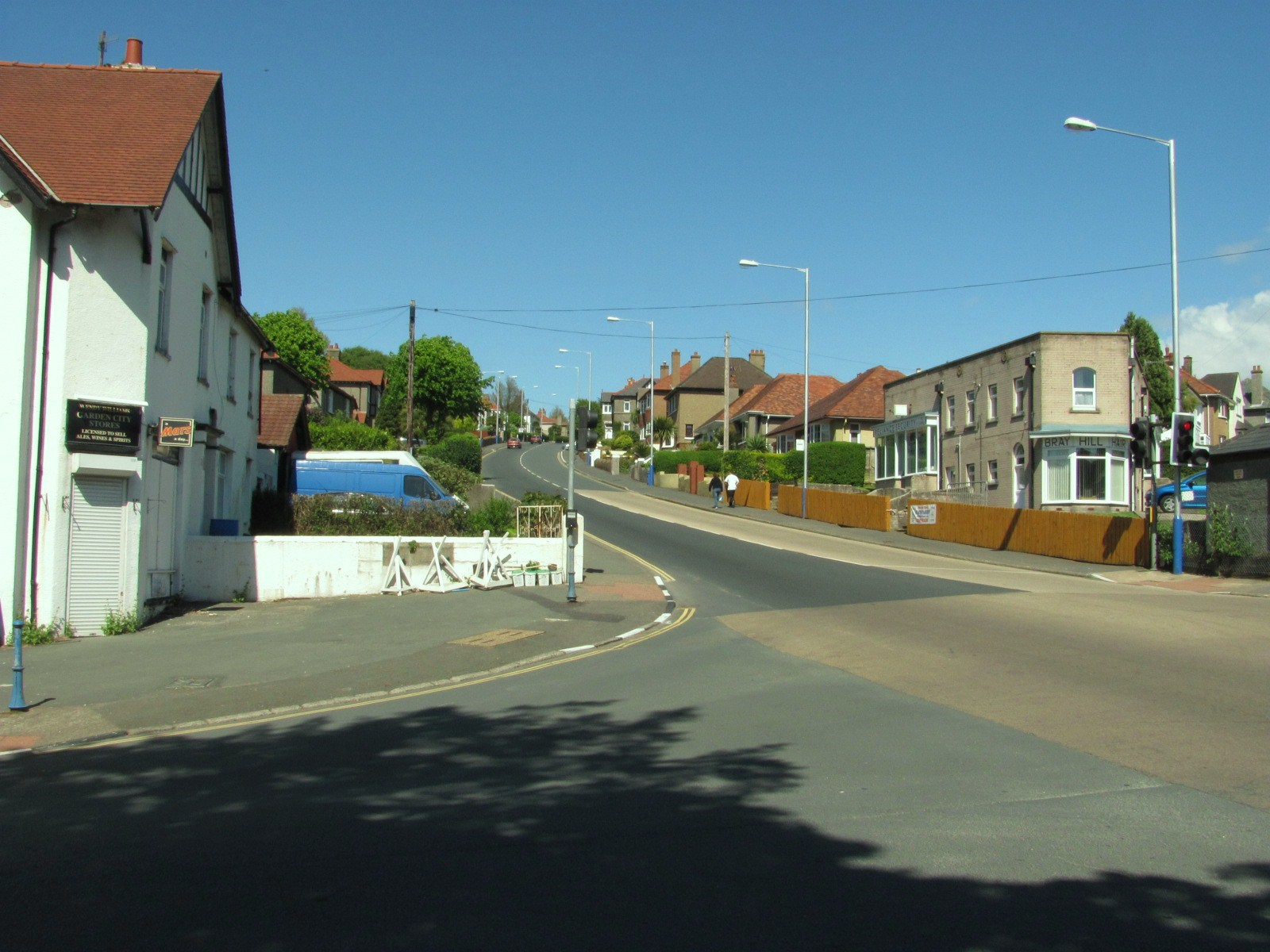
Junction where A2 Bray Hill merges into the A2 Quarterbridge Road in Douglas.

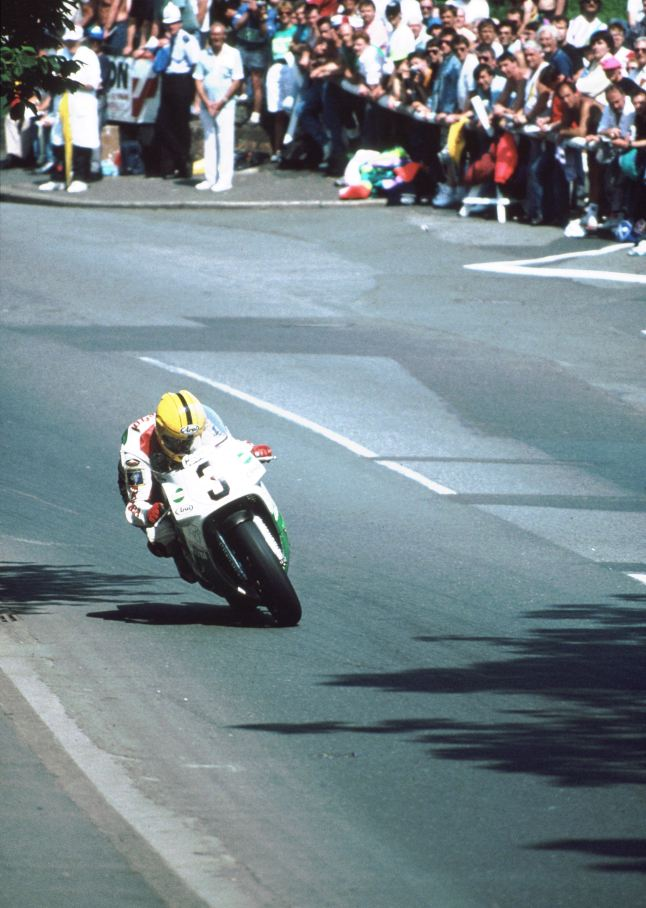
Joey Dunlop at the bottom of Bray Hill in the 1992 Senior TT race, on his Honda RC30

Bray Hill (Lowland Scots: Brae a slope) is a road in the Isle of Man. It was formerly a country lane known as the Great Hill during the time of the ownership of the Duke of Atholl, and was previously known as Siberia, originally a triangle-shaped parcel of land in the Murray Estate.

Bray Hill is a steep downhill section of the TT course situated between the TT Grandstand and the 1st Milestone road-side marker on the Snaefell Mountain Course on the primary A2 Douglas to Ramsey road in the town of Douglas in the Isle of Man.

The Bray Hill section runs from St Ninian's Crossroads, where the A2 Glencrutchery Road (from the TT startline) meets the side streets of Ballanard Road and Ballaquayle Road on the A22, continuing to the base of the hill where it becomes the A2 Quarterbridge Road at a crossroad-junction with side streets named Tromode Road, Stoney Road, and Thorny Road.

Bray Hill was part of the Highland Course and Four Inch Course used for the Gordon Bennett Trial and Tourist Trophy car races held between 1904 and 1922. For the 1934 and 1935 car races, the whole length of Bray Hill from its junction with Stoney Road was part of the Mannin Moar Course.

The startline and refuelling area for the Isle of Man TT races was situated at the top of Bray Hill for the 1914 TT races, moving in 1920 to the Nobles Park area of the A2 Glencrutchery Road. Bray Hill is part of the Snaefell Mountain Course used since 1911 for the TT races and Manx Grand Prix since 1923.

The A2 Bray Hill and A2 Quarterbridge Road were subjected to major road repairs and re-profiling during the winter of 1978/79 by the Isle of Man Highway Board. This followed two fatal accidents at the start of the 1978 Sidecar TT 'A' race involving sidecar crew of Mac Hobson/Kenny Birch on Bray Hill and Swiss sidecar competitor Ernst Trachsel on nearby Quarterbridge Road.

In 2013, a rider lost control on the first lap of the Senior TT and his machine impacted with spectators near to the bottom of the hill, close to the junction, injuring eleven.

== Gallery ==
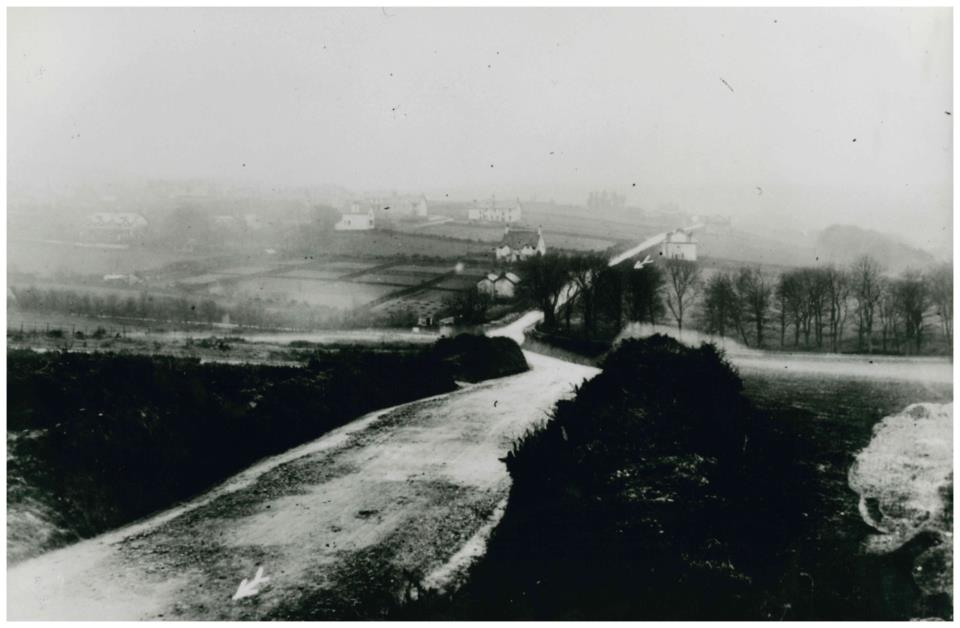
An early photographic image of Great Hill.

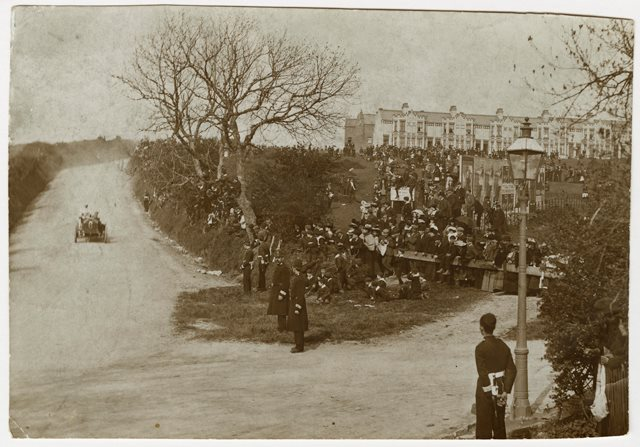
A Car Descends Bray Hill during the Gordon Bennett Trial.

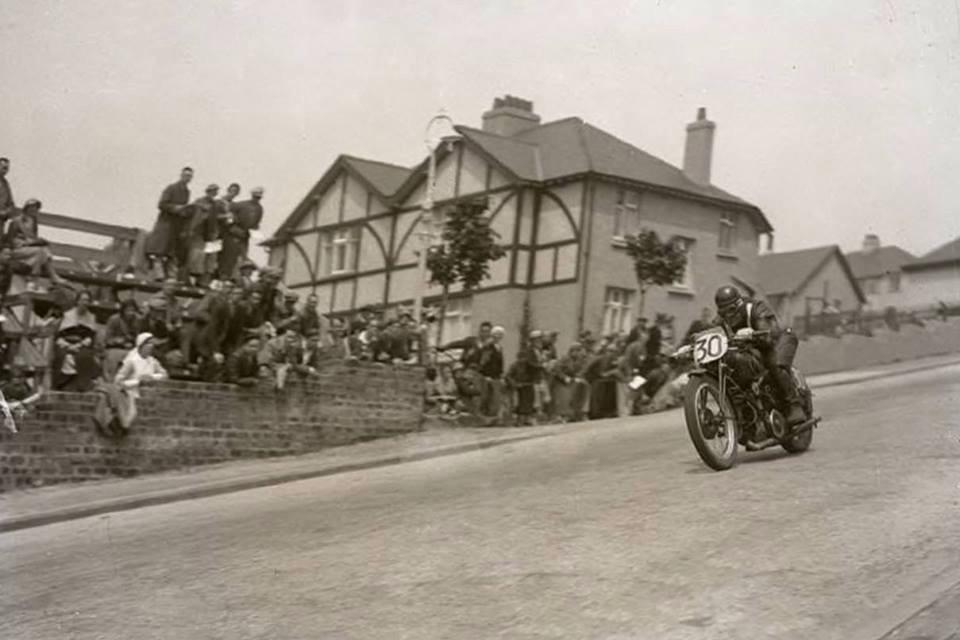
Stanley Woods on board a Moto Guzzi, passes the Bray Hill/Port-e-Chee Avenue junction, as he descends the hill during the 1935 TT Races.

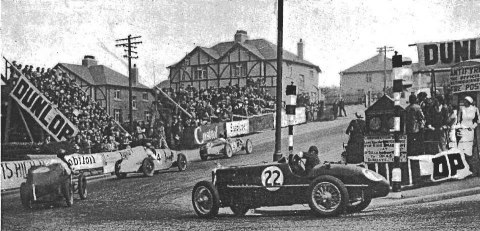
Cars turn the corner from Stoney Road into Bray Hill during the Mannin Moar Car Race.

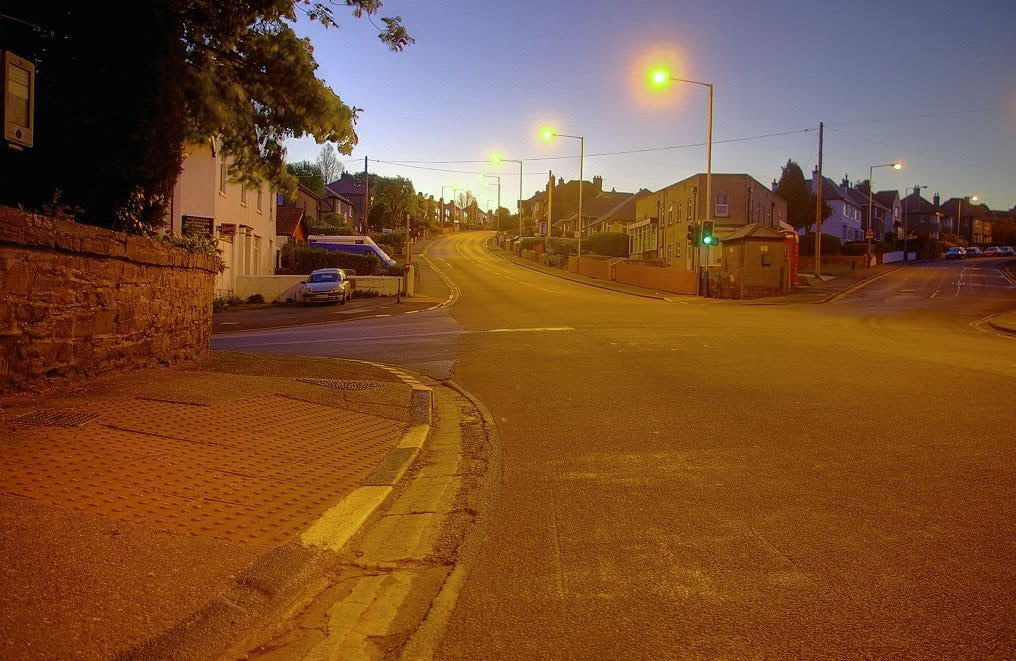
Bray Hill at dusk. The racing line is tight into the kerb, hence the scraping of the road surface created by the motorcycles' fairing belly pans as their suspension compresses.
