= New Hudson =

New Hudson may mean:

- New Hudson (company), a former UK engineering and motorcycle manufacturing company
- New Hudson, New York, the town located in Allegany County, New York
- New Hudson, Michigan, an unincorporated community within Lyon Township, Oakland County, Michigan
