= Quarterbridge Road =

Road in the Isle of Man

Coordinates: 54°09′30″N 4°29′45″W

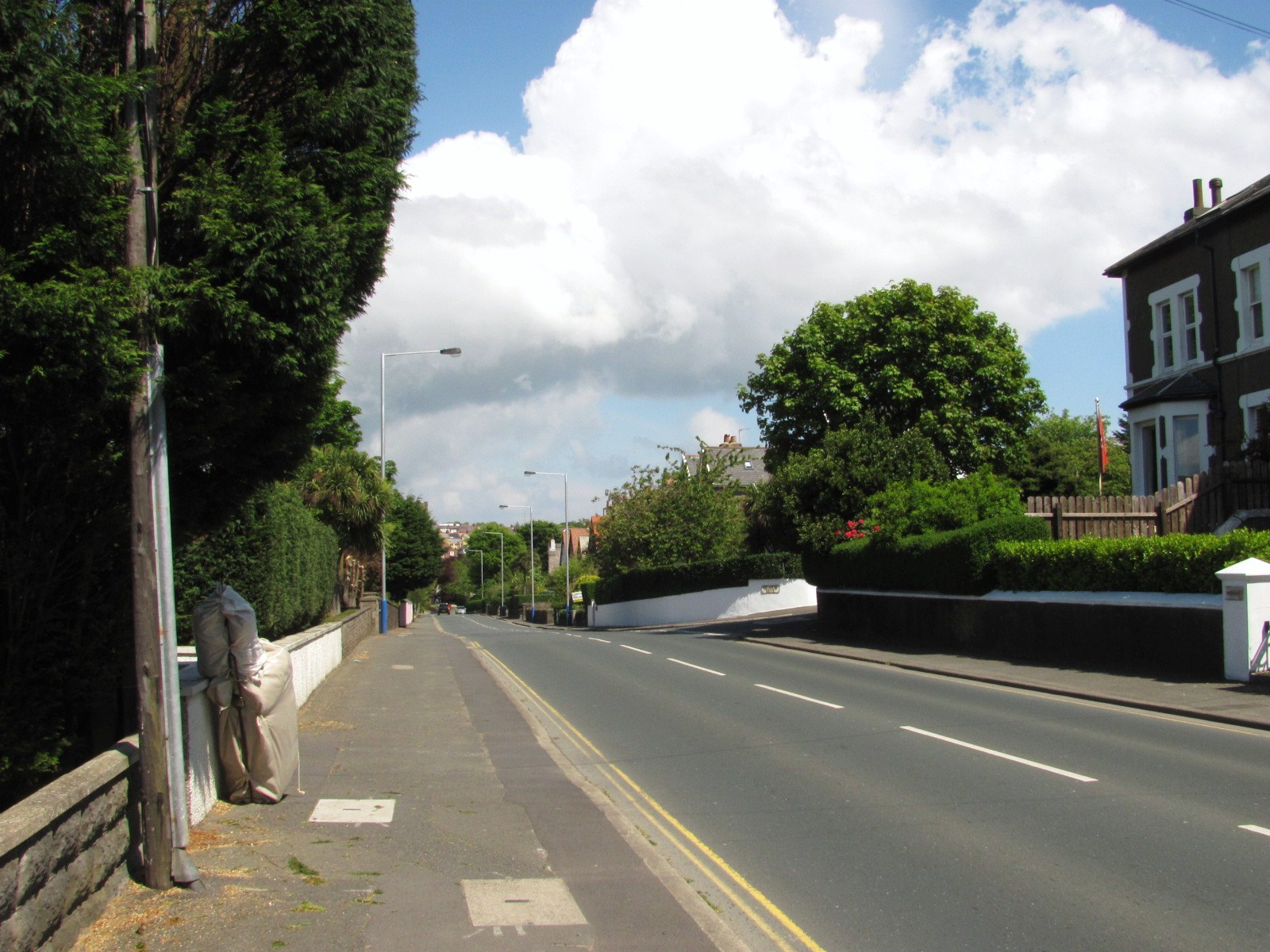
The A2 Quarterbridge Road, with the level section of road used as the start area for Isle of Man TT 1911–1913 in foreground with the crest of the rise at Selborne Drive visible in the background. This photograph is from 2010.

Quarterbridge Road (Manx: The Quarters or Quarter Dub – quarterlands of Ballabrooie and Ballaquayle) is a section of roadway notable for its inclusion in the Isle of Man TT races.

It is adjacent to the 1st Milestone road-side marker measured from the startline at TT Grandstand used for the Snaefell Mountain Course on the primary A2 Ramsey to Douglas road in the town of Douglas, Isle of Man.

The Quarterbridge Road runs from the bottom of Bray Hill to the major road junction at the Quarterbridge, where it meets the primary A1 Douglas to Peel road and the A5 Douglas to Port Erin road. The A2 Quarterbridge Road also has minor side-road junctions in the residential outskirts of Douglas town.

The start of Quarterbridge Road is the site of the area which famously became known as Ago's Leap, after motorsport photographer, the late B.R. 'Nick' Nicholls, took a photograph of motorcycle racer Giacomo Agostini wheelying during the 1970 TT Senior race riding his MV Agusta.

== History ==
The A2 Quarterbridge Road was part of the Highland Course and Four Inch Course used for the Gordon Bennett Trial and Tourist Trophy car races between 1904 and 1922. For the 1906 Tourist Trophy car race, the start was moved from the Quarterbridge/A5 New Castletown Road to the Quarterbridge Road/Alexander Drive road junction adjacent to a property called 'Woodlands' in Douglas town.

The start line for the 1908 Tourist Trophy car race was again moved from the Quarterbridge Road to Hillberry Corner as part of the then-new Four Inch Course.

The A2 Quarterbridge Road is part of the Snaefell Mountain Course used for the motorcycle TT races (since 1911) and the Manx Grand Prix (since 1923). The start line for the 1911 TT races was originally situated on the level section of the Quarterbridge Road between Selborne Drive and the 1st Milestone/Alexander Drive.

The start line and refuelling area was moved to the top of Bray Hill for the 1914 TT races, and then moved in 1920 to the Nobles Park area of the A2 Glencrutchery Road with the junction of Greenfield Road in Douglas.

During the 1953 Senior TT, the inaugural 1949 500 cc World Champion Les Graham lost control of his 500 cc MV Agusta motorcycle on lap two of the race on the uneven surface of the Quarterbridge Road and fatally crashed. A fatal accident to the Australian competitor Geoffrey Walker during the same race at Kerrowmoar prompted major safety revisions and alterations to the Snaefell Mountain Course during the winter of 1953/54. This included the widening of the Quarterbridge Road at the Quarterbridge junction with A1 Peel Road.

The A2 Quarterbridge Road, including junctions with Selborne Drive and Brunswick Drive and the A2 Bray Hill, were subjected to major road repairs and re-profiling during the winter of 1978/79 by the Isle of Man Highway Board. This followed fatal accidents during the start of the 1978 Sidecar TT Race 'A' to the Swiss sidecar competitor Ernst Trachsel on Quarterbridge Road and the sidecar crew of Mac Hobson/Kenny Birch on nearby Bray Hill.
