= St Ninian's Crossroads =

Coordinates: 54°09′54″N 4°29′01″W

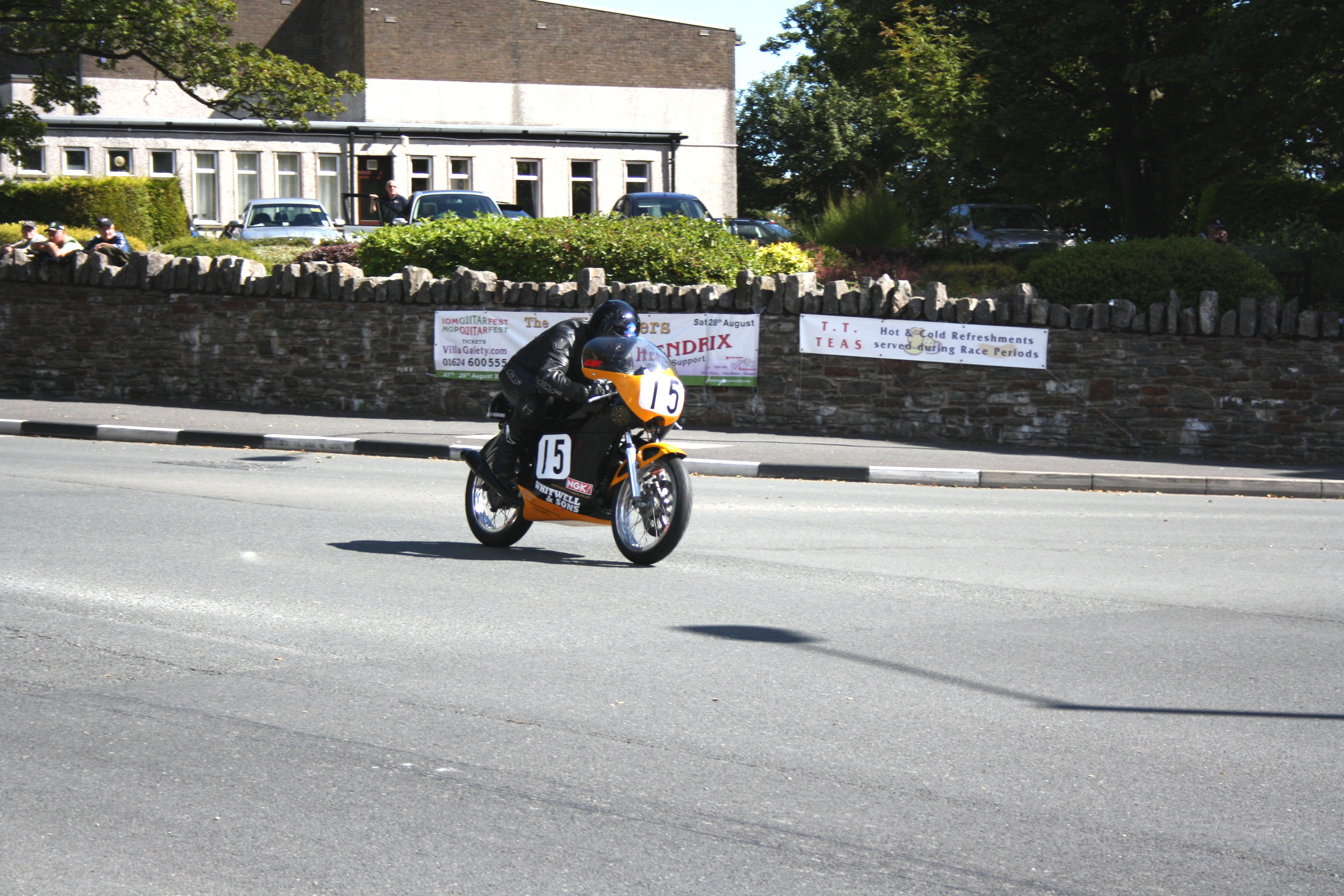
Ken Davis at St Ninian's Crossroads during the 2010 Manx Grand Prix, Junior Classic

St Ninian's Crossroads (Manx: Ballaquayle, Quayle, or MacFayle's farm - the quarterland of Ballaquayle) is situated between the TT Grandstand and the 1st Milestone road-side marker on the Snaefell Mountain Course on the primary A2 Douglas to Ramsey road in the town of Douglas in the Isle of Man.

The St. Ninian's Crossroads is a major road junction of the A2 Glencrutchery Road with the A2 Bray Hill, the A22 Ballanard Road and Ballaquayle Road in Douglas. The area is dominated by St. Ninian's Church (dedicated to Ninian of Whithorn) designed by W.D.Caroe and is a major landmark on the skyline of the town of Douglas. The land to build the church in 1913 was bequeathed by Henry Bloom Noble through trustees of his estate. In 1924, the Douglas High School for Boys was constructed on a nearby site by the Isle of Man Education Board and is now the coeducational St Ninian's High School (Schoill Ard Noo Ninian).

The crossroads at St. Ninian's was part of the Highland Course and Four Inch Course used for the Gordon Bennett Trial and Tourist Trophy car races held between 1904 and 1922. The St. Ninian's Crossroads road is part of the Snaefell Mountain Course used since 1911 for the Isle of Man TT races and the Manx Grand Prix since 1923.

During the 1914 Junior TT race, Frank Walker's view of the A23 Ballanard Road was obscured by spectators who had encroached onto the road to watch the competitors. Passing the Judges-Box at the finish-line, Walker continued at full racing speed through St. Ninians Crossroads, collided with a wooden barrier in Ballaquayle Road, was thrown from his motorcycle and later died of his injuries at nearby Nobles Hospital.

The St Ninian's Crossroads as Parkfield Corner was part of the Clypse Course used between 1954 and 1959 for the Isle of Man TT and for the Manx Classic Races as part of the Willaston Circuit between 1988 and 2000.

In 1971 the first permanent site of traffic light signals in the Isle of Man were installed at St.Ninian's crossroads. Part of the road junction with Ballaquayle Road and St Ninian's church was widened and re-profiled in 2007 by the Isle of Man Department of Transport.
