= Jake DeRosier =

Canadian motorcycle racer (1880-1913)

- Nationality: (Canada) Canadian
- Born: 1880
- Died: February 1913 (aged 32–33)
Motorcycle racing career statistics
Isle of Man TT career
TTs contested	1 (1911)
TT wins	0
TT podiums	0

Jacob DeRosier (1880 – February 25, 1913) was a Canadian professional motorcycle racer. He was one of the first factory-backed motorcycle racers of the early 20th century. He rode for Indian and then Excelsior, and was the fastest rider in the United States in the early 1900s.

== Early years ==
Jake DeRosier was born in Quebec, Canada in 1880 and came to the United States at the age of four. He started his bicycle racing career as a teenager. French auto racing driver Henri Fournier introduced DeRosier to motorcycles in 1898 while visiting the United States. Motorcycles like Fournier's were used to pace bicycle racers, drafting them in order to attain higher speeds. After acquiring skills with the motorbike, DeRosier was among the first to enter the new sport of motorcycle racing in 1901.

DeRosier earned a strong reputation as a daring rider not only by winning races, but bouncing back from numerous injuries. His diminutive physique, once described as "a slight, slender fellow that a strong Christmas breath might blow over," was actually an advantage. His light weight helped the primitive, low power motors of the time achieve greater speed.

== Factory rider for Indian ==
After winning top rider honors at the Federation of American Motorcyclists national championship in 1908 at Paterson, New Jersey, DeRosier attracted the attention of the Indian Motocycle Company. He was signed to a contract and began racing every week, amassing hundreds of victories over time. Like the bicycles, the motorcycles raced on wooden velodromes, one-quarter to one-half mile (0.40 to 0.80 km) saucer shaped board track speedways. This was dangerous as riders would crash into the boards, breaking bones and driving splinters deep under their skin.

DeRosier's reputation grew and by the time he entered the first motorized competition at the new Indianapolis Motor Speedway for their August 1909 Federation of American Motorcyclists (FAM) meet, newspapers called him "world champion." An injury on the Speedway's unpaved gravel surface nearly proved deadly. Severely injured in a match race with a top California rider named Ed Lingenfelder, DeRosier hemorrhaged for a week. Against doctors' advice, DeRosier entered a Lowell, New Jersey race just a few weeks later on September 10, 1909.

In 1910, DeRosier set the FAM speed record at 79.6 mph (128.1 km/h). On February 7, 1911 he ran 90 consecutive miles to claim every FAM speed record from 1 to 100 miles.

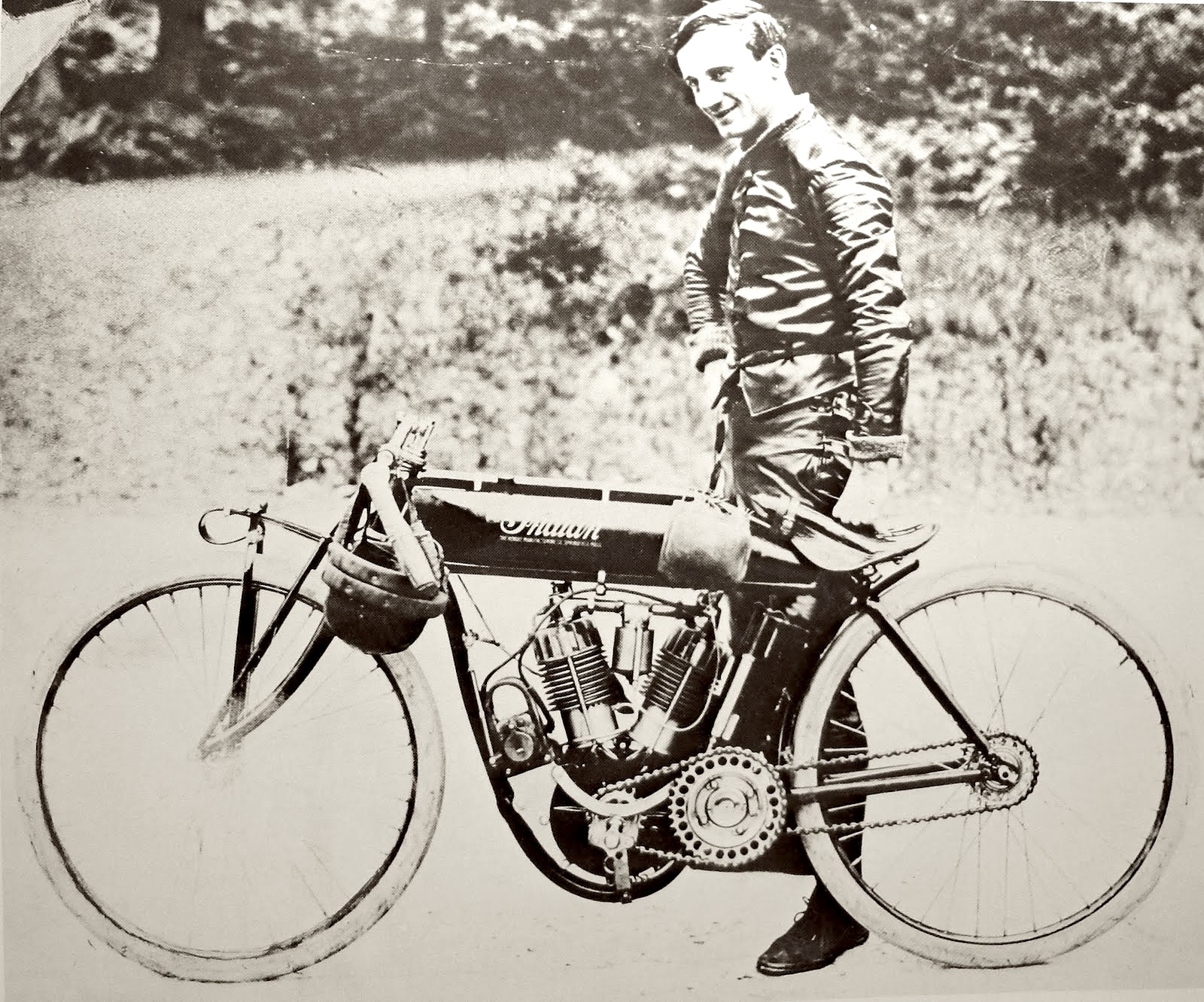
Canadian-American motorcycle racer Jake De Rosier at the Isle of Man TT in 1911

In June 1911, DeRosier tackled the 1911 Isle of Man TT race. While he set fast time in practice, he crashed out of competition after leading early. Redeeming himself, he defeated English Champion Charles Collier at the famous Brooklands oval speedway in a match race just a few days later.

At the Brooklands (England) races of July 8, DeRosier was recorded at 87 mph (140 km/h) (The MotorCycle July 13, 1911). At Brooklands on August 5, 1911, he broke the outright speed record (held by Henri Cissac since July 1905) when he covered a flying kilo in 25.2 seconds equal to 88.77 mph (142.86 km/h). He was riding his well known 7 hp Indian racer "No 21". (The MotorCycle August 10, 1911).

== Move to Excelsior ==
After DeRosier returned from England in 1911, he had an argument with company founder George Hendee and was fired from Indian. He was immediately hired by Excelsior Motorcycles. He then set a kilometer speed record for Excelsior at 94 mph (151 km/h).

== Injuries and death ==
While DeRosier was widely respected for his skills at the wheel of a motorcycle, he spent much of his career injured in spectacular accidents. He broke his left leg three times, his left forearm once, had one rib removed, fractured his skull, severed an artery and suffered serious leg burns from flaming engines.

DeRosier suffered the most serious injuries of his career on March 12, 1912. Injuries to his left leg and thigh were extensive. He endured three corrective surgeries, losing his life to complications from the final operation on February 25, 1913.
