= TT Grandstand =

Track grandstand and paddock in the Isle of Man

Coordinates: 54°10′04″N 4°28′41″W

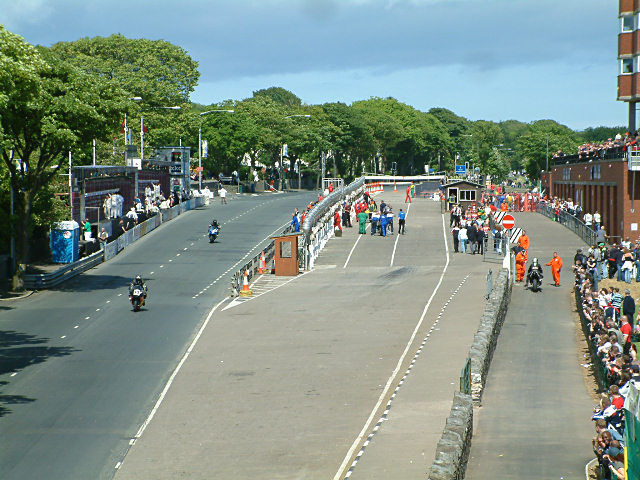
TT Grandstand area with scoreboard to extreme left, course start/finish to left (in distance), pit lane with re-fuelling equipment and acceleration lane to centre, and return road to extreme right leading to parc ferme in distance

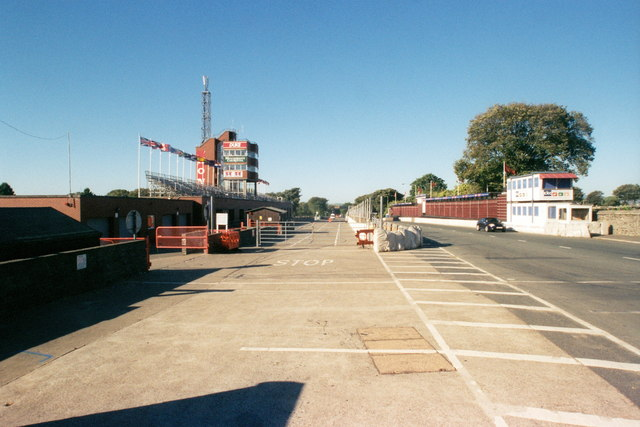
Pit lane approach with machine pre-race assembly area to extreme left, concourse with grandstand to left, demarcated lanes with re-fuelling equipment to centre, course start/finish on A2 Glencrutchery Road with timekeeper's box and scoreboard to extreme right

The TT Grandstand including the startline, pit lane, re-fuellers, merchandising, scoreboard and paddocks for the Isle of Man TT and Manx Grand Prix races is situated on the A2 Glencrutchery Road, in the town of Douglas, Isle of Man.

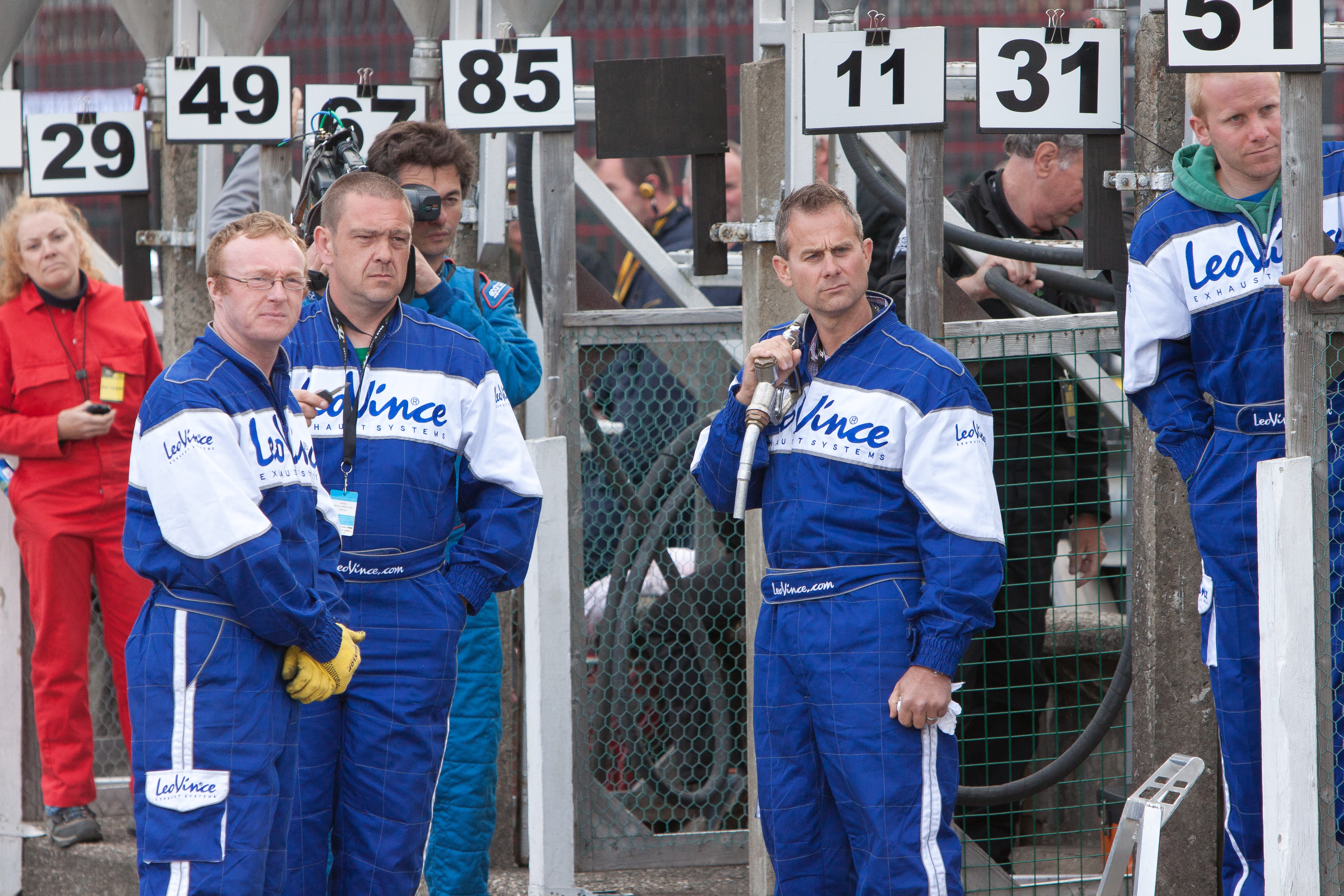
Former racer James Whitham (centre right with nozzle over his shoulder) as part of a 2012 TT refuelling crew

== History ==
The startline for the 1911 TT races was originally situated on a level section of the A2 Quarterbridge Road between Selborne Drive and Woodlands Lodge in Douglas.

The startline and refuelling area was moved to the top of Bray Hill for the 1914 TT races, and then moved in 1920 to the Nobles Park area of the A2 Glencrutchery Road at the junction of Greenfield Road in Douglas.

For the 1920 TT races, changes were made to the Snaefell Mountain Course and competitors turned left at Cronk-ny-Mona and followed the primary A18 Mountain Road to Governor's Bridge Dip with the new start/finish line nearby on the A2 Glencrutchery Road which lengthened the course to 37.75 miles (60.75 km).

For the 1926 Isle of Man TT races the startline section at Glencrutchery Road was improved by road widening and building of a new grandstand complex at a cost of £2,000.

The 1920s wooden structure was demolished and replaced with a modern purpose-built brick design on newly acquired land for the 1986 TT Races. The new development incorporated a race control and communications tower, a wider pit-lane and seating placed 30 ft (9.1 m) further away from the refuellers due to FIM requirements for enhanced competitor and spectator safety concerning fire-risk.

Proposals to re-locate the facility to the other side of the Glencrutchery Road were rejected as being more costly than the projection of £GB450,000.

== Concourse facilities ==
The official TT regulations paddock diagram shows many public, technical and administrative areas developed into the Grandstand, including:

- VIP hospitality
- Licensed area
- Food and Drink
- Trade sites - motorcycling-related sales
- Winners enclosure
- Race office
- Technical inspection - scrutineering
- Tower and Press office
- Scoreboard
- Timing box
- Hailwood Centre - refreshments
- Assembly area/Parc Ferme

The grandstand includes VIP hospitality areas and a licensed area for spectators.

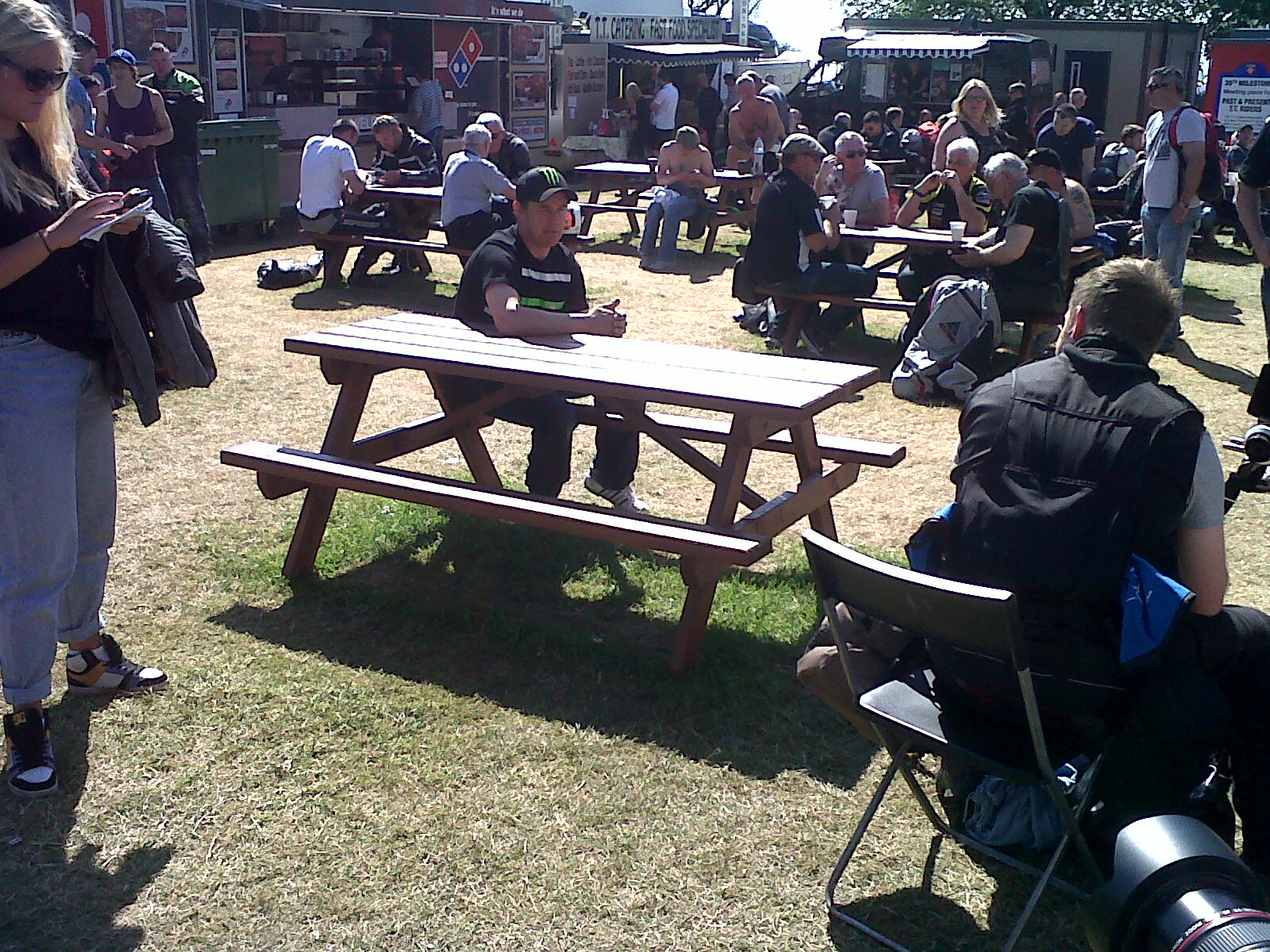
TT rider John McGuinness awaiting a press interview at a picnic bench in the public catering area at the rear of the TT Grandstand during 2013 TT races, with Mrs McGuinness standing to left

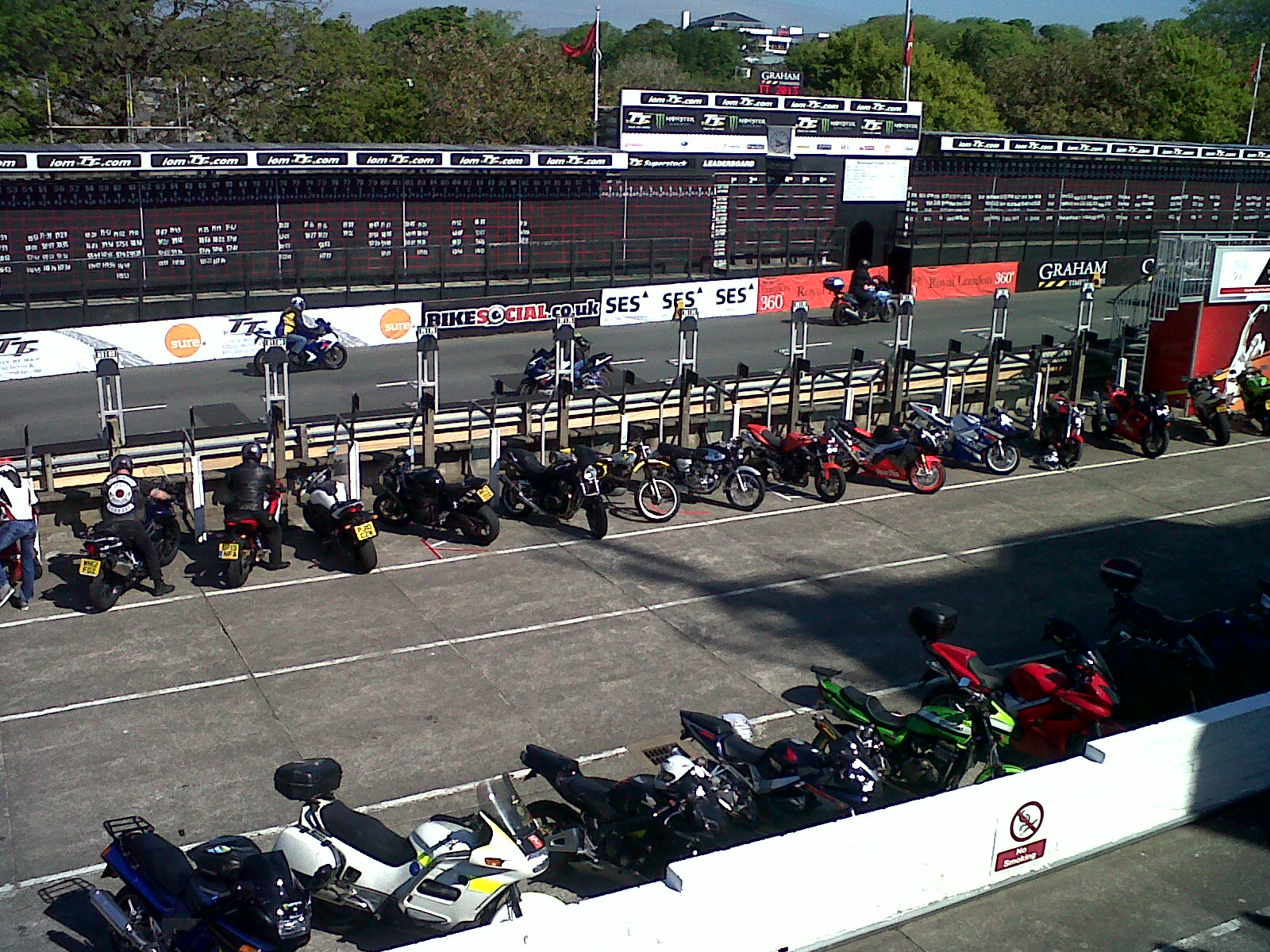
View from the Grandstand seating area showing pit-boxes with refuelling stands, then-used for visitor bike-parking on a non-race day, with scoreboard to far side across the Glencrutchery Road

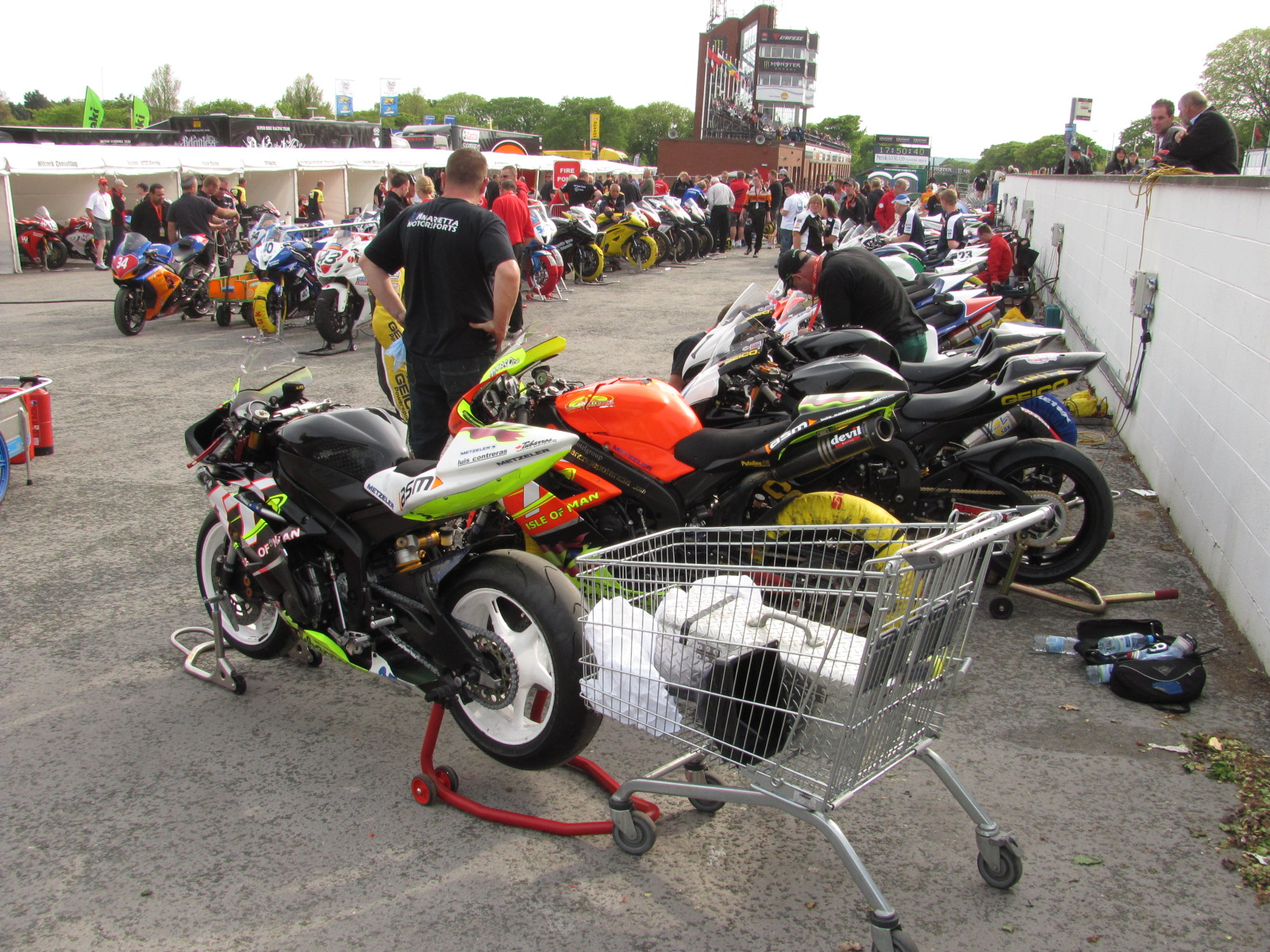
Pre-race assembly area adjacent to startline showing machines with tyre warmers plugged into wall-mounted electrical outlets

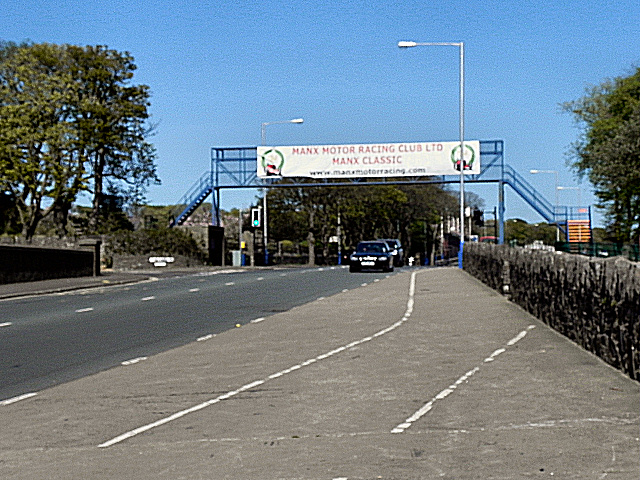
Deceleration lane starts after footbridge leading to turnaround

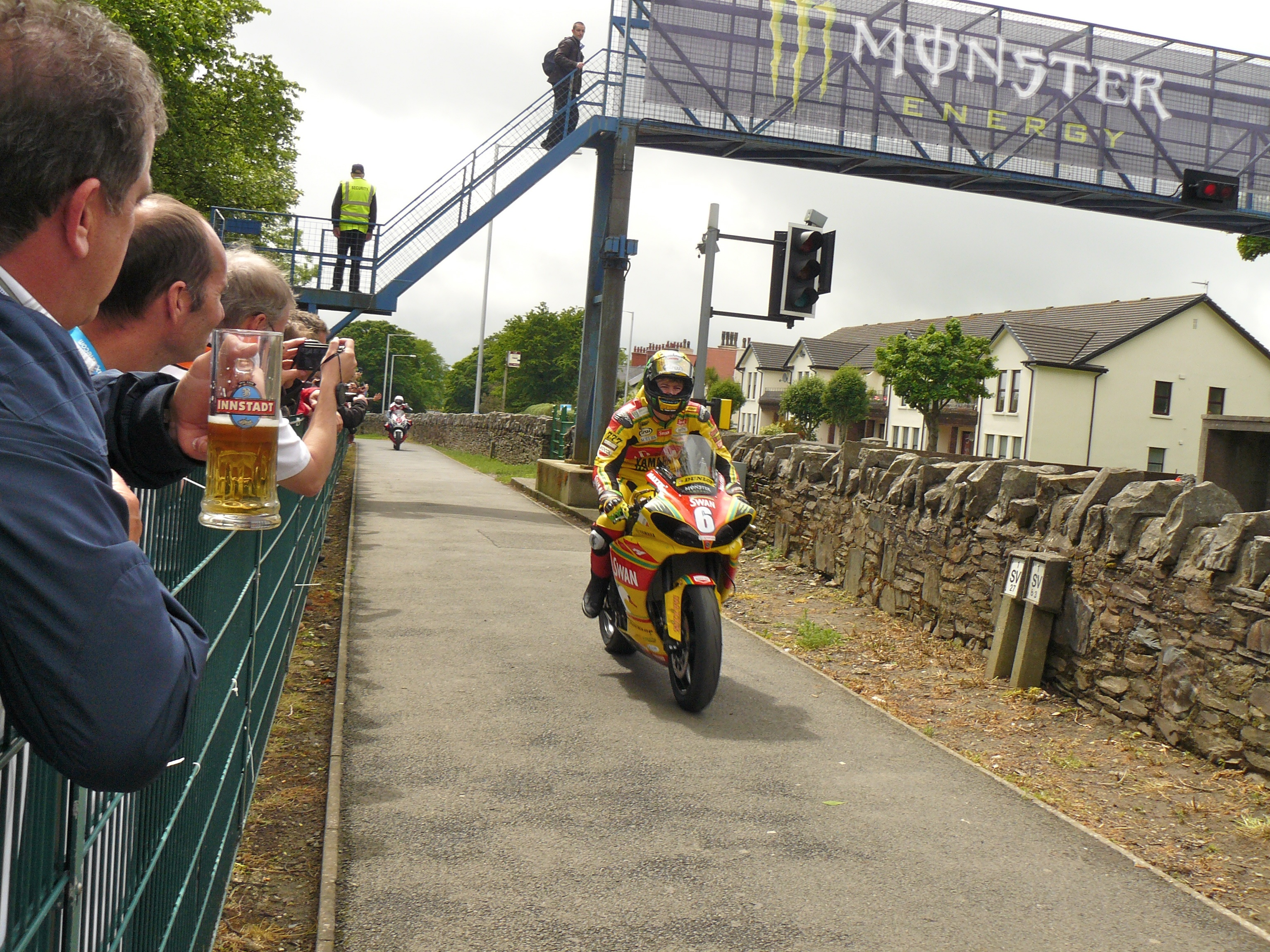
Ian Hutchinson on the return road to TT paddock parc ferme after the Supersport TT 600 race in 2012

== Acceleration/deceleration lane and return road ==
The acceleration lane leads from the pit lane to re-join the main road. The deceleration lane provides a braking area, terminating in a hairpin turn-around loop in Nobles Park before connecting to the return road, leading back to the winners enclosure and parc fermé, situated as part of the paddock complex, for all race finishers.

== Temporary accommodation ==
Temporary holiday accommodation in the paddock for TT time was established from 2012 until 2017. The complex was provided by Snoozebox, a business having former Formula 1 racing driver David Coulthard as a principle.

The accommodation was in the form of 45 ft (14 m) stacked shipping containers, modified and fitted-out as commodious sleep cells.
