= Joseph Lucas =

Lamp manufacturer

Joseph Lucas (12 April 1834 – 27 December 1902) was a lamp manufacturer and the founder of electrical equipment manufacturer Lucas Industries.

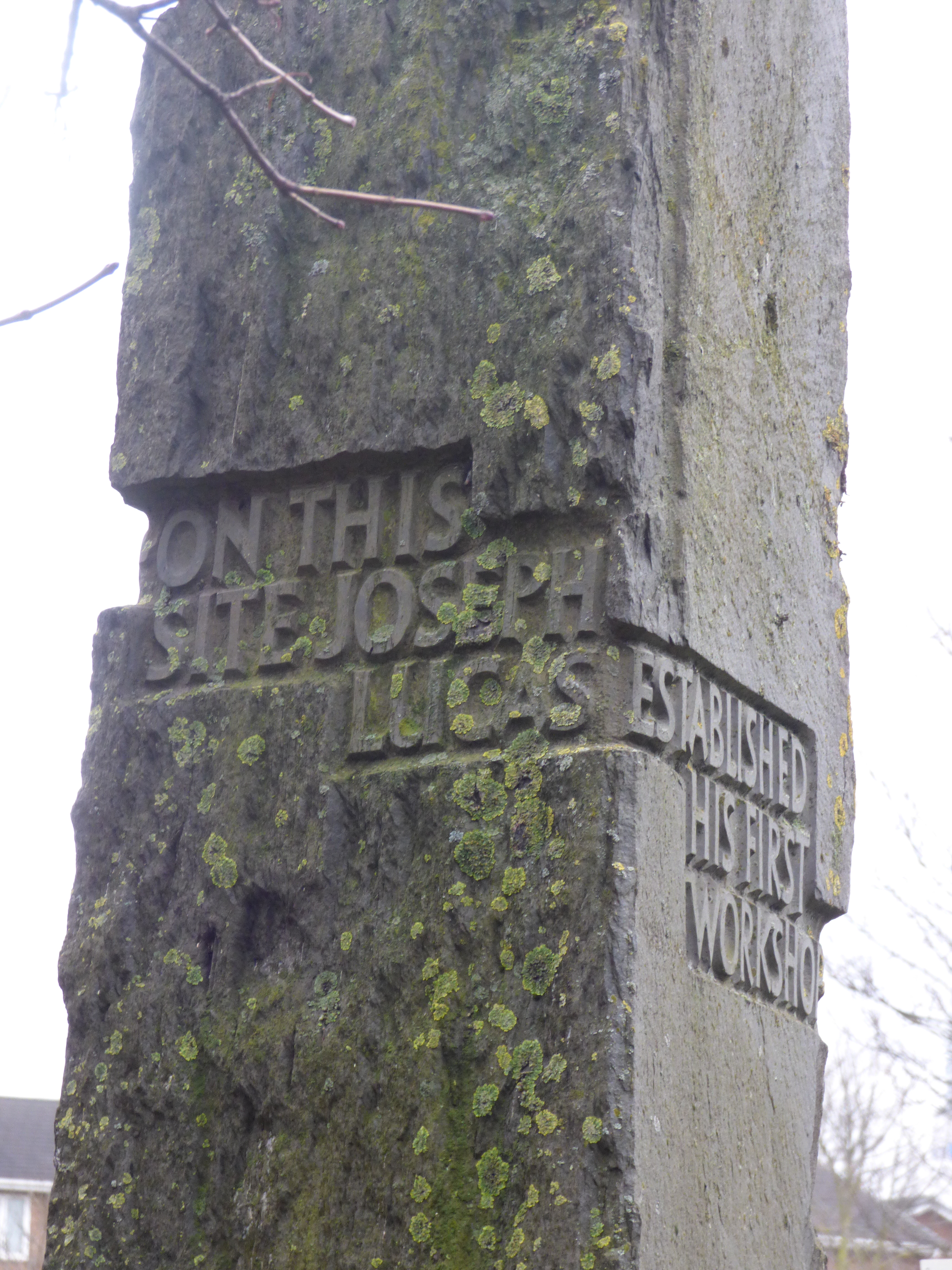
Monument at Great King Street North, Birmingham

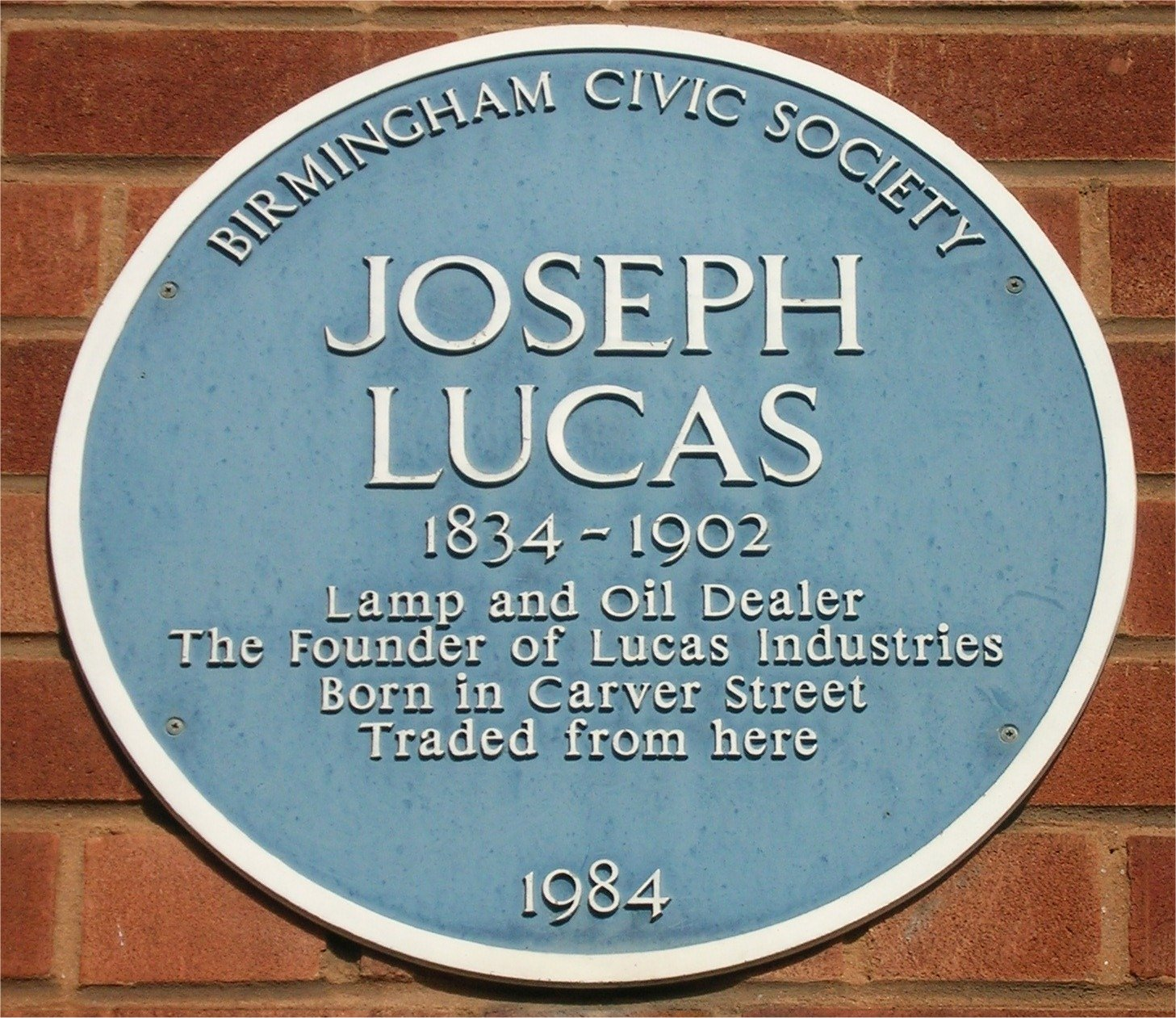
blue plaque

== Career ==
Born in Carver Street, Hockley, Birmingham, England in Birmingham's Jewellery Quarter and educated at a local Church Sunday School, Joseph Lucas was apprenticed to H. & G.R. Elkington, Silversmiths, in 1847.

In 1860 he established a business selling buckets, shovels and other oddments. In 1872 he admitted his son, Harry, into his business and within three years they opened the Lamp Works in Little King Street in Birmingham. They concentrated on the new types of lamp burning paraffin and petroleum for which there was considerable demand. The business became Lucas Industries.

He died in Naples of typhoid after drinking contaminated water (he was a devout teetotaller and would not drink wine) when on a Mediterranean tour with his third wife. His body was brought back to England for burial, which took place on 14 January 1903 at St. Mary's Church, Moseley.

== Family ==
In 1854 he married Emily Stephens (1833–1885) and together they went on to have six children. In 1885 he married Maria Tyzack and in 1901 he married Mary Anne Owen (1850–1939).
