= Lucas Industries =

British component manufacturer, 1860–1996

Lucas Automotive
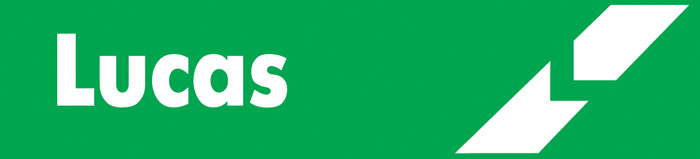
- Type: Public
- Traded as: LSE: LC
- Industry: Automotive aftermarket
- Founded: 1875
- Founder: Joseph Lucas
- Fate: Acquired by TRW Inc. in 1999. TRW Inc. acquired by ZF Friedrichshafen AG in 2015. Lucas Industries Ltd name changed to ZF International UK Limited in 2019.
- Successor: ZF Friedrichshafen AG - ZF
- Headquarters: Friedrichshafen, Germany

Lucas Industries plc, now known as Lucas Automotive, is one of the world’s oldest continuously trading automotive brands, tracing its origins to 1875 and the first patent issued to its founder, Joseph Lucas.

Based originally in Birmingham, the company grew over the years into a manufacturer and supplier of automotive industry and aerospace industry components to vehicle and aerospace manufacturers around the world.

Lucas continues to operate as a recognised brand for automotive aftermarket products manufactured and distributed by exclusive agreements with established international partners. Lucas products are available in most countries and there are manufacturing plants located in Europe, South America, Tunisia, China, and other locations.

== History ==
=== Foundation ===
In the 1850s, Joseph Lucas, a jobless father of six, sold paraffin oil from a barrow around the streets of Hockley. In 1860, he went on to found the firm that would later become Lucas Industries. His 17-year-old son Harry joined the firm around 1872. At first the firm made general pressed metal merchandise, and later in 1875, they branched out into lamps for ships. Joseph Lucas & Son was based in Little King Street from 1882 and later Great King Street, Birmingham. The business of Joseph Lucas & Sons was incorporated into Joseph Lucas Ltd in 1897.

=== King of the Road ===
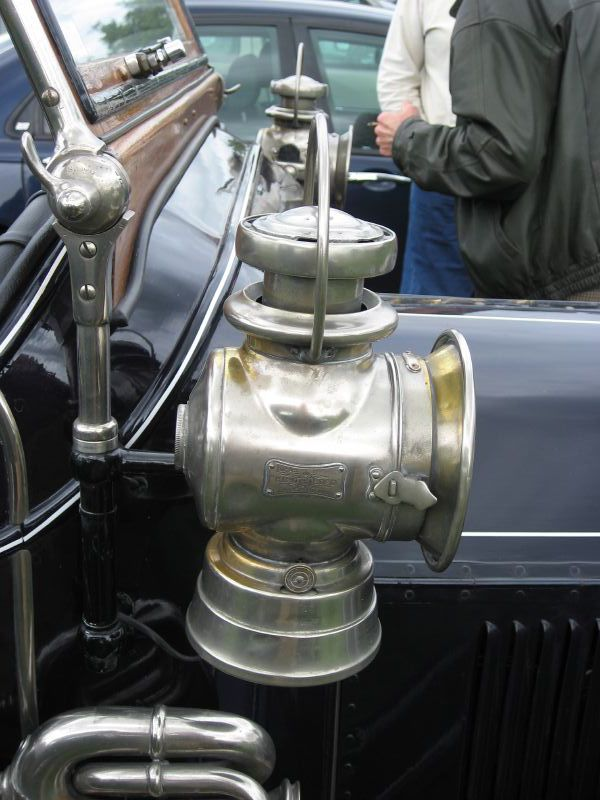
Side Lamp, King of the Road, "will not blow out in the toughest gale"

Lucas "King of the Road" lamps

In 1879, Joseph’s son Harry designed an oil hub lamp for use on high wheel bicycles and christened it the ‘King of the Road’, which birthed a Lucas sub-brand. ‘King of the Road’ would come to be associated with the manufactured products of Lucas Companies, although its use was reserved for their most prestigious, and usually highest priced, electrical goods. The naming format lasted until the 1940s with the ‘King of the Road’ used profusely on communication material whilst product branding was limited to bicycle lamps and batteries.

In 1896, Joseph and Harry Lucas formed a joint-stock corporation with the New Departure Bell Co. of America in order to manufacture their bicycle lamps in America and thus avoid import duties.

The ‘King of the Road’ name is still used today on several products in the Lucas Classic parts programme.

=== 1902 to World War I ===
In 1902, Joseph Lucas Ltd started making automotive electrical components such as magnetos, alternators, windscreen wipers, horns, lighting, wiring and starter motors. It was in 1914, however, that the company's significant growth commenced when they won a contract to supply Morris Motors Limited with electrical equipment. During World War I Lucas manufactured shells and fuses, as well as electrical equipment for military vehicles. Lucas remained the principal supplier of magnetos, dynamos, alternators, switches and other electrical components to British manufacturers (such as BSA, Norton and Triumph) until the early 1970s.

=== UK general strike 1926 ===
Thousands of workers belonging to Birmingham's Lucas electrical factory walked out and joined the 1926 United Kingdom general strike. Birmingham communist activist and trade union leader Jessie Eden, who was a volunteer union steward for the only section of unionised women in the factory, convinced the women to join the strike. The strike was depicted in the British crime drama Peaky Blinders.

=== 1931 women's strike ===
Jessie Eden again organised another strike of Lucas factory workers in 1931, this time leading 10,000 non-unionised women on a week-long strike, during which she joined the Communist Party of Great Britain (CPGB). Before the strike, Eden had noticed that Lucas factory supervisors had been closely observing her work, and that the supervisors were monitoring her because she was a fast worker and that they planned to use her work speed as a standard for all the other workers in the factory. Eden approached the Amalgamated Engineering Union; however, they did not allow women to join their membership so she instead approached the Transport & General Workers' Union (T&G). In protest to the factory's plans, Eden organised a mass walkout of 10,000 Lucas factory worker women, who refused to work for a week. The strike was successful and the Lucas Electrics factory management was forced to back down. After the victory, the overjoyed factory workers were so ecstatic that the factory could not function during normal hours and had to be closed early. One of the communist activists who had encouraged Eden was raised up upon the shoulders of factory workers at a dinner hour in celebration. This strike was described by the Trades Union Congress as "unprecedented at the time", and led to the T&G's leader (then Ernest Bevin) to award Jessie Eden with the union's Gold Medal. Eden's leadership and organisation of the Lucas Electronics factory strike prompted a massive increase in the number of women in the midlands joining British trade unions.

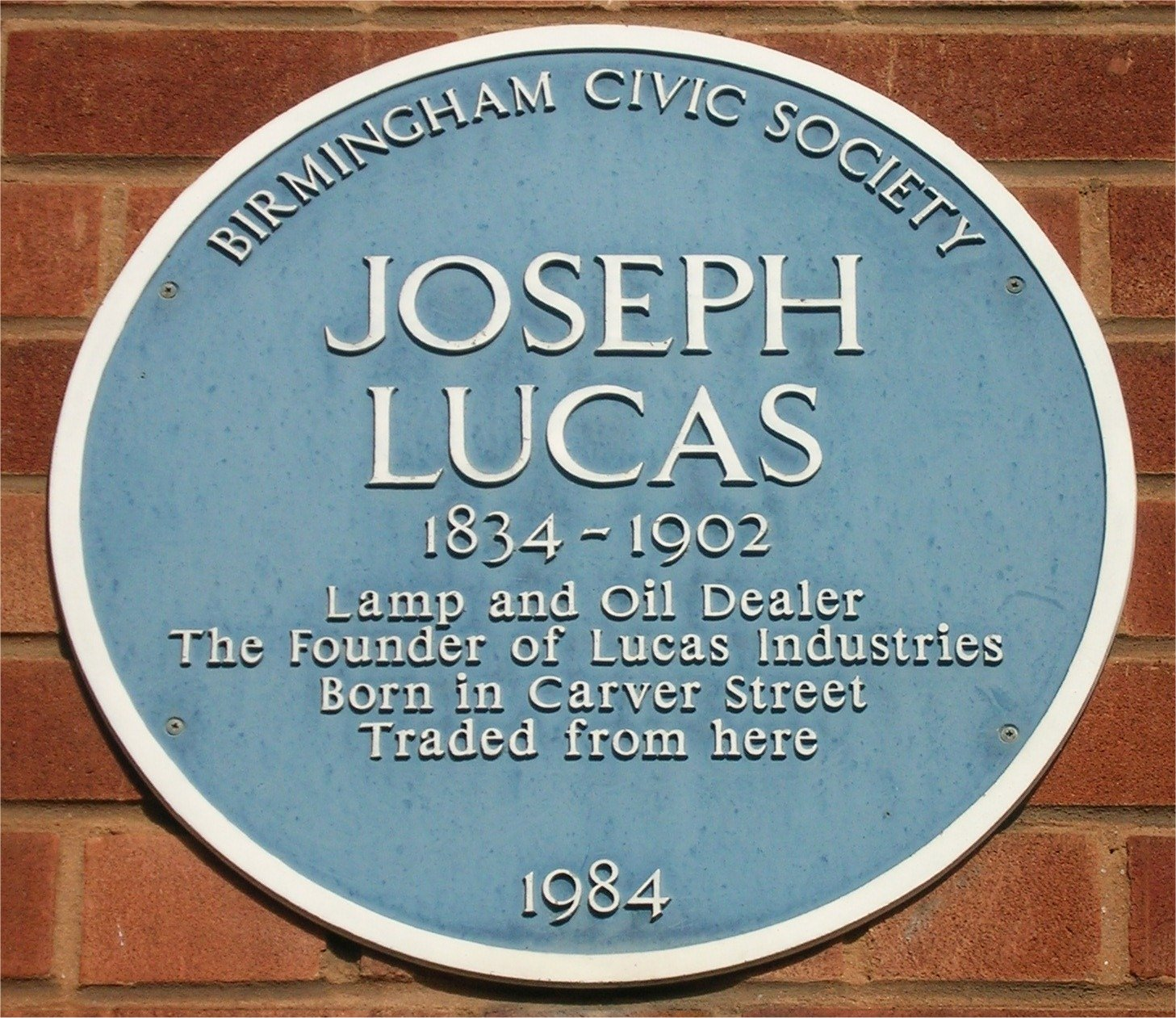
Blue plaque on factory building in Carver Street, Birmingham

=== Post-World War I expansion ===
After World War I, the firm expanded rapidly, branching out into products such as braking systems and diesel systems for the automotive industry and hydraulic actuators and electronic engine control systems for the aerospace industry. In 1926 they gained an exclusive contract with Austin. Around 1930, Lucas and Smiths established a trading agreement to avoid competition in each other's markets. During the 1920s and 1930s Lucas grew rapidly by taking over a number of their competitors such as Rotax and C.A.Vandervell (CAV).

=== World War II and after ===
During World War II, Lucas was engaged by Rover to work on the combustion and fuel systems for the Whittle jet engine project, specifically making the burners. In about 1957 they started a semiconductor manufacturing plant to make rectifiers and transistors.

The company’s name was changed to Lucas Industries Ltd in 1975 and to Lucas Industries plc in 1982 when it was listed on the London Stock Exchange and became a constituent of the FTSE 100 Index.

=== Lucas Plan (1976) ===
In 1976, the workforce within Lucas Aerospace were facing significant layoffs. Under the leadership of Mike Cooley, they developed the Lucas Plan to convert the company from arms to the manufacture of socially useful products, and save jobs. The plan was described at the time by the Financial Times as "one of the most radical alternative plans ever drawn up by workers for their company", and by Tony Benn as "one of the most remarkable exercises that have ever occurred in British industrial history". The Plan took a year to put together, consisted of six volumes of around 200 pages each, and included designs for 150 proposed items for manufacture, market analysis and proposals for employee training and restructuring the firm's work organisation.

The plan was not put into place but it is claimed that the associated industrial action saved some jobs. In addition, the Plan had an impact outside of Lucas Aerospace: according to a 1977 article in New Statesman, "the philosophical and technical implications of the plan (were) now being discussed on average of twenty-five times a week in international media". Workers in other companies subsequently undertook similar initiatives elsewhere in the UK, continental Europe, Australia and the United States, and the Plan was also supported by and influenced the work of radical scientists such as the British Society for Social Responsibility in Science and community, peace and environmental activists through spreading the idea of encouraging socially useful production. The Plan's proposals also had an influence on the economic development strategies of a number of Labour councils, for example, the West Midlands, Sheffield, Cleveland and the Greater London Council, where Cooley was appointed Technology Director of the Greater London Enterprise Board after being sacked by Lucas in 1981.

=== Factory automation and lighting ===
In 1987, the Lucas Research Centre in Shirley, Birmingham, developed a flexible automatic assembly system designed to manufacture a range of multi-variant automobile headlamps. The system was subsequently implemented at the division's Cannock Headlamp Factory.

=== LucasVarity (1996) ===
In August 1996, Lucas Industries plc merged with the North American Varity Corporation to form LucasVarity plc. Its specific history is covered on the LucasVarity page but for the sake of continuity key aspects of the old Lucas business histories to date, particularly that referring to CAV and Lucas Diesel Systems are still included here.

== Acquisitions and agreements ==
Lucas also acquired many of its British competitors:

=== CAV ===
CAV Ltd. was headquartered in Acton, London making diesel fuel injection equipment for diesel engine manufacturers worldwide and electrical equipment for commercial and military vehicles.

The company was formed by Charles Anthony Vandervell (1870–1955), making accumulators, electric carriage lamps, and switchboards in Willesden.

In 1904, the firm moved to Warple Way, Acton. The firm pioneered the dynamo-charged battery principle and in 1911 it produced the world's first lighting system used on a double-decker bus. By 1918 1,000 employees were making vehicle electrics and aircraft magnetos. Wireless components were also made from 1923.

In 1926 CAV was bought by Lucas. In 1931, CAV in partnership with Robert Bosch, became CAV-Bosch Ltd and began making fuel injection pumps for the diesel industry and later fuel systems for aircraft. Lucas bought Bosch's interest out in 1937 and it became CAV Ltd in 1939. In 1978 the company's name became Lucas CAV. In 1980 the Acton factory employed around 3,000 people making heavy-duty electric equipment for commercial vehicles, by this time high volume diesel fuel injection manufacturing had been relocated to larger modern factories in Kent, Suffolk, Gloucestershire, and many countries throughout the world. Acton continued to make low volume specialist pumps for the military and for Gardner engines.

The electrical business was sold to US company Prestolite Electric in 1998 and remained at Acton until relocating to nearby Greenford in 2005.

The diesel fuel injection equipment research, engineering, and manufacturing business known in later years as Lucas Diesel Systems Ltd continue at all of the worldwide sites (with the exception of those in Japan and South Carolina, US, which had closed by this time) and since 2000 has been owned by Delphi, a US-domiciled automotive parts and systems manufacturer. The name has been changed to Delphi, and the business is a major part of the Delphi Powertrain Division.

Worldwide diesel fuel injection business sites: England - Gillingham, Kent; Park Royal, London; Stonehouse, Gloucestershire. France - Blois and La Rochelle. Brazil - São Paulo. Mexico - Saltillo. Spain - Sant Cugat, Barcelona. Turkey - İzmir. India - Mannure, Chennai. Korea - Changwon, Busan.

=== Butlers Limited ===
Butlers Limited formed as a family business of brassfounders at Small Heath, Birmingham, and developed as an important manufacturer and supplier of motor vehicle lamps.

In 1948, at the time of its acquisition by Lucas, 60 per cent of Butler's production was represented by its sales of lamps of various types to Ford Motor Company and Vauxhall Motors and to Simms (who resold the lamps to heavy vehicle manufacturers) for use as initial equipment.

At this time, Butlers was supplying the whole of Ford's requirements of lamps for initial equipment. Butlers also had a substantial business in the supply to wholesalers of accessory lamps, mainly foglamps and spare tail-lamps of various sizes. Lucas reported that it knew that Ford, Vauxhall and Simms would not like the purchase and that it did not want to upset them or disturb Butlers' wholesale customers or its own wholesalers at home or abroad; nevertheless it decided to accept the offer it had received from Butlers on the general ground that it would be a mistake to refuse the additional capacity, particularly for short orders and obsolete types of lamps.

In 1952, the purchase of the share capital of Butlers was effected through nominees, and ownership by Lucas was not made public until 1952 when the company was listed as a subsidiary in Lucas's Annual Report. Also Lucas did not want to bring the spares side of Butlers' business into the Lucas distribution and service network but wished to study it and find out how it worked. Lucas also said that it did not want to add to current press criticism of itself as a monopolistic giant which absorbed competitors.

=== Girling ===
The company started as a car brake manufacturer after, in 1925, Albert H. Girling (also co-founder of Franks-Girling Universal Postage) patented a wedge-actuated braking system. In 1929 he sold the patent rights to the New Hudson company. Girling later developed disc brakes, which were successful on racing cars from the early 1950s to the 1970s. Girling brakes had the quirk of using natural rubber (later nitrile) seals, which caused difficulties for some American owners of British cars because of incompatibility with US brake fluids.

Girling brake manufacture was taken over by Lucas in 1938, but the patent remained held by New Hudson until this in turn was purchased by Lucas in 1943. Lucas then moved its Bendix brake and Luvax shock absorber interests into a new division which became Girling Ltd. Girling products included:

- Brake systems
- Clutch systems
- Shock absorbers
- Hydraulic dampers - a short-lived Luvax/Girling cooperation that moderated up and down leaf spring movement by turning that motion into a horizontal back and forth motion from the center. The damper hydraulically moderates, equally, both upward and downward motion of the wheels. In this sense, they are quite different from telescopic shock absorbers, which mainly moderate upward movement of the wheel. Such dampers were used for a few years on light-weight British post-war cars, such as MG and Austin.

=== Rotax ===
Rotax went through several name changes and manufacturing locations, the last of these being the former premises of the Edison Phonograph Company in Willesden, west London in 1913. Initially a motorcycle accessory business, Rotax began to specialise in aircraft components after the World War I. After an initial proposal for Lucas and Rotax to jointly take over CAV, Lucas decided in 1926 to take over both companies.

In 1956, Lucas Rotax opened a new plant in the new town of Hemel Hempstead to the north of London. Lucas Rotax was later renamed Lucas Aerospace. By the 1970s, the company had 15 plants at various locations.

=== Aerospace ===
Originally Called Lucas GTE (Gas Turbine Equipment) Based in Birmingham from its link with the early Rover Jet engine development. Lucas during the late 1960 and early 70s purchased (given help/encouragement by the British government) various aerospace related companies to create a British world class aerospace equipment supplier to complement Rolls-Royce Jet engine manufacturer in a failed attempt to become a major player in the expanding world aviation market. Hobson's, Rotax, the Smiths Industries aerospace related companies were all consumed to create this expanded company.

One of the many factories was based in the Park Royal Industrial Estate, London, opposite Lucas Rotax. This facility provided components for BAE Systems, principally for the Stingray Torpedo Project.

=== Simms ===
In 1913, Frederick Richard Simms started Simms Motor Units Ltd, which in World War I became the principal supplier of magnetos to the armed forces. In 1920, the company took over a former piano factory in East Finchley, North London. During the 1930s the factory developed a range of Diesel fuel injectors. In the World War II, the company again became the principal supplier of magnetos for aircraft and tanks, also supplying dynamos, starter motors, lights, pumps, nozzles, spark plugs and coils.

The East Finchley factory continued to expand after the war, eventually reaching 300,000 square feet (28,000 m^{2}). In 1955, the company acquired seven other British light engineering companies: R.F. Landon Partners, Horstman, Mono-Cam, Hadrill and Horstmann, Industrial Fan and Heater, Clearex Products and Simplus Products. At the end of 1957, the company formally changed its name to Simms Motor and Electronics Corporation Ltd., informally known as the Simms Group. The Simms Group was taken over by Lucas in 1968 and integrated within the CAV division. Manufacturing in East Finchley was steadily run down and the factory closed in 1991 to be redeveloped for housing. It is commemorated by Simms Gardens and Lucas Gardens.

== Cross-licensing agreements ==
In the 1920s, Lucas signed a number of cross-licensing agreements with Bosch, Delco, and most of the other automotive electrical equipment manufacturers in Europe and North America. In addition, these agreements included a non-competitive clause agreeing that Lucas would not sell any electrical equipment in their countries and they would not sell electrical equipment in Great Britain. By the mid-1930s, Lucas had a virtual monopoly of automotive electrical equipment in Great Britain.

== Reception and reputation ==
With a monopoly in place, Lucas proceeded to supply electrical equipment that was commonly cited as the best reason not to buy a British car. The poor reliability of Lucas auto-electrics earned it the nickname "Prince of Darkness". Incidentally, the heavy metal musician Ozzy Osbourne, who adopted the nickname as part of his stage image and was also from Birmingham, was a former Lucas Industries employee as was his mother. Among American owners of British cars, the repertoire of jokes expanded significantly; one journalist recounts thirdhand that a Lucas executive had "never encountered ribaldry towards his employer until he moved stateside."

Popular Lucas jokes include:

- "Did you know that the Lucas headlamp switch has three positions? Dim, flicker and off."
- "Why do the Brits drink warm beer? Lucas refrigerators."
- "What does the company name stand for? Loose Unsoldered Connections And Splices."
- "Lucas vacuum cleaners—the only Lucas product that doesn’t suck."

== UK sites ==
- Acton (Diesel Systems)
- Antrim (Electrical)
- Atlantic Works, Grange Rd, Small Heath, Birmingham (Butlers Ltd)
- Bradford (Aerospace)
- Broadgreen, Liverpool (Aerospace)
- Bromborough ( - Industrial Braking)
- Burnley (Aerospace (4 sites) and Automotive (3 sites))
- Cannock, Staffordshire (Automotive Lighting)
- Cirencester (Automotive)
- College Road, Perry Barr (Automotive Electronics)
- Cranmore Boulevard (Starter Motor Drives)
- Cwmbran (Automotive Brakes)
- Dog Kennel Lane, Shirley (Aerospace, Automotive, Consulting and Research)
- Fazakerley, Liverpool (Automotive, Diesel Systems)
- Fen End, Birmingham (Test Track)
- Finchley
- Fordhouses, Wolverhampton (Aerospace)
- Formans Road, Birmingham (Batteries)
- Fradley, Woodend Lane, Staffordshire (Distribution)
- Fradley, Gorse Lane, Staffordshire (B90 Remanufacturing, Automotive)
- Gillingham, Kent (Diesel Systems)
- Great King Street, Birmingham (HQ + Automotive)
- Great Hampton Street, Birmingham (Automotive)
- Hemel Hempstead (Aerospace)
- Honiley (Aerospace)
- Huyton, Liverpool (Aerospace)
- Kings Road, Tyseley, Birmingham (Automotive Brakes)
- Luton (Aerospace)
- Marshall Lake Road, Birmingham (Aerospace)
- Marston Green, Birmingham (Aerospace)
- Mere Green (Automotive Electrical)
- Netherton Liverpool (Aerospace)
- Newcastle-under-Lyme (Wiring Harnesses)
- Oakenshaw Road, Shirley (Electronics)
- Park Royal London (Diesel Systems)
- Pontypool (Automotive Brakes)
- Read Street, Coventry (Aerospace)
- Shaftmoor Lane (Aerospace and Alternators)
- Shipley (Aerospace)
- Shirley, Solihull (HQ, Aftermarket, Group Research)
- Spring Road, Hall Green (Aerospace)
- Stonehouse, Gloucestershire (Diesel Systems)
- Sudbury (Diesel Systems)
- Telford, Halesfield (Automotive Lighting)
- Telford, Stafford Park (Flexible Machining Services)
- Telford, Stafford Park (Rists, Wiring Harnesses)
- Witney Oxfordshire (Instrument clusters)
- York Road, Birmingham (Aircraft Engine Management)
- Ystradgynlais, South Wales (Wiring Harnesses)

== See also ==
- History of East Finchley, Simms Motors
