= 1911 Isle of Man TT =

Annual motorcycle racing event

1911 Isle of Man Tourist Trophy

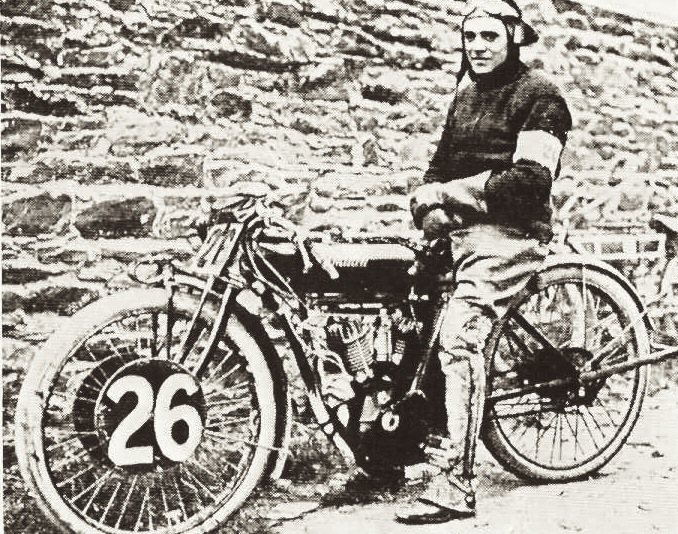
Oliver Godfrey on winning Indian racer
- Date: 30 June, 3 July 1911
- Location: Douglas, Isle of Man
- Course: Mountain Course,(Four Inch Course); 37.5 mi (60.4 km)
- Organiser: Auto-Cycle Union
- Clerk: J.R. Nisbet

Junior TT
- First: Percy Evans, Humber
- Second: Harry Collier, Matchless
- Third: Harold Cox, Forward

Fastest lap
- Percy Evans; 53min. 24sec. 42.13 mph (New record)

Senior TT
- First: Oliver Godfrey, Indian
- Second: Charles Franklin, Indian
- Third: Arthur Moorhouse, Indian

Fastest lap
- Frank Philipp, Scott; 44min. 52sec. 50.11 mph (New record)

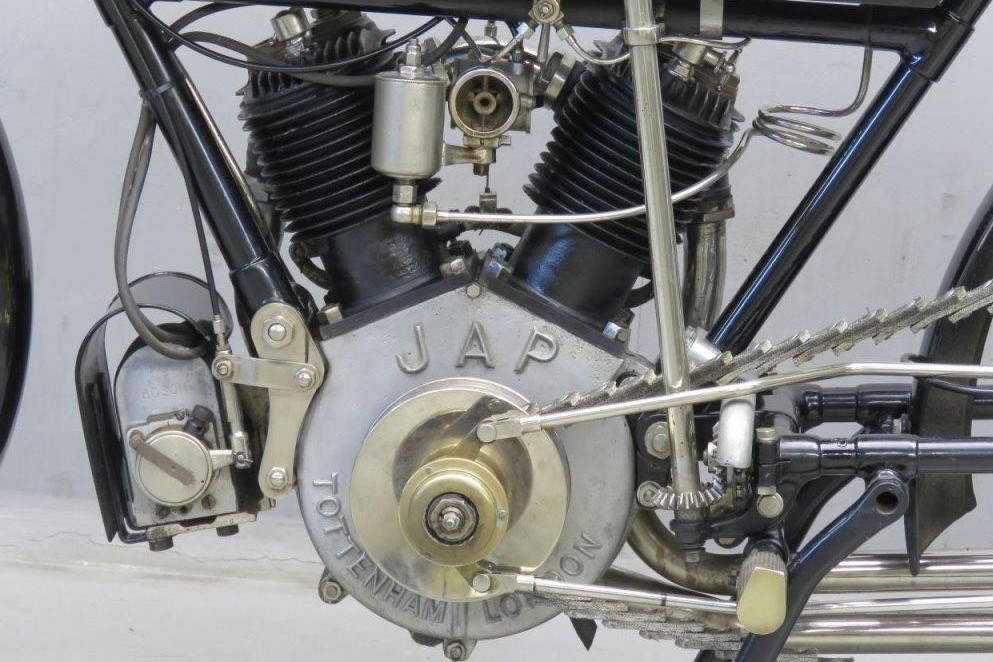
2¾ hp Zenith-Gradua 297cc.

The 1911 Isle of Man Tourist Trophy races took place for the first time over the Isle of Man TT Mountain Course. The whole organisation of the races was given over to the Auto-Cycle Union (ACU), which announced the use of the longer mountain course with a four lap (150-mile (240 km)) Junior race on Friday 30 June, and five laps (189-mile (304 km)) for the Senior race on Monday 3 July. In only five years the TT races had matured and commercialism had set-in. Grandstands were built by the Douglas Corporation in what had been popular and free vantage points in Douglas, to the displeasure of the public.

Preparations for this new, challenging course that meant an 8-mile (13 km) uphill climb from Ramsey to Brandywell prompted the manufacturers to devise methods of modifying their mainly single-gear machines to cope with the Snaefell mountain road not once, but several times. Harry Collier, on the single-cylinder Matchless, and Percy J. Evans fought for first place in the Junior event. In the Senior event, British pride and prestige was dented when the Indians took the first three places. Charlie Collier crossed the finish line second on his Matchless, but was disqualified for refuelling outside of the designated area.

On Friday, 27 June 1911, the first fatal accident in connection with the Tourist Trophy races happened. While practicing for the forthcoming race, Victor Surridge was taking a difficult corner on Cregwilly's Hill near Glen Helen section of the course, dashing into a hedge and breaking his neck. He was nineteen years of age.

== Junior TT final standings ==
Friday 30 June 1911 – 4 laps (150 miles (240 km)) Four Inch Course/Isle of Man TT Mountain Course

(Isle of Man) The 5th International Auto-cycle Tourist Trophy

Pos	#	Rider	Bike	Cyl.	Junior TT race classification			
Pos	#	Rider	Bike	Cyl.	Laps	Time	Speed	Prizes & remarks
1	17	(United Kingdom) Percy Evans	2¾ hp Humber 339cc	2	4	3:37.07	41.45 mph	1st Prize - Winner of Junior Trophy and £40
2	15	(United Kingdom) Harry Collier	2hp Matchless-JAP 295cc	1	4	3:46.20	39.74 mph	2nd Prize - £20. First single-cylinder
3	26	(United Kingdom) Harold Cox	2¾ hp Forward 339cc	2	4	3:55.26	38.22 mph	3rd Prize - £10 and Silver cup for First private owner.
4	24	(Isle of Man) Douglas Brown	2¾ hp Humber 339cc	1	4	3:56.24	38.07 mph	Gold Medal.
5	36	(United Kingdom) H. Greaves	2¾ hp Enfield 340cc	2	4	3:56.34	38.04 mph	Gold medal.
6	5	(German Empire) Karl Kassert	2½ hp NSU 338cc	2	4	3:57.23	37.91 mph	Gold medal.
7	18	(United Kingdom) Willie Douglas	2¾ hp Douglas 340cc	2	4	4:00.11	37.47 mph	Gold medal.
8	24	(Isle of Man) Arthur Fenn	2¾ hp Humber 339cc	2	4	4:01.19	37.29 mph	Gold medal.
9	10	(United Kingdom) Percy Johnson	2¾ hp Humber 339cc	2	4	4:04.10	36.86 mph	Gold medal and Silver cup for Second private owner
10	2	(United Kingdom) Jack Haslam	2¾ hp Zenith-Gradua 297cc	1	4	4:04.11	35.85 mph	Gold medal.
11	21	(United Kingdom) Peter Weatherilt	2¾ hp Zenith-Gradua 297cc	1	4	4:05.37	36.64 mph	Gold medal.
12	31	(United Kingdom) Gordon L Fletcher	2¾ hp Douglas 340cc	2	4	4:10.33	35.92 mph	Gold medal.
13	14	(United Kingdom) Graham Dixon	2¾ hp New Hudson 297cc	1	4	4:14.09	35.92 mph	Gold medal.
14	12	(United Kingdom) Sam Wright	2¾ hp Humber 339cc	2	4	4:19.27	34.68 mph	Gold medal.
15	28	(United Kingdom) J.D. Corke	2½ hp AJS 298cc	1	4	4:23.14	34.19 mph	
16	33	(United Kingdom) Albert J Stevens	2½ hp AJS 298cc	1	4	4:26.37	33.75 mph	
17	20	(United Kingdom) Norman Slatter	2 hp Alcyon 299cc	1	4	4:29.18	33.41 mph	First single geared machine.
18	34	(United Kingdom) W.E. Grange	2¾ hp Humber 339cc	2	4	4:44.30	31.63 mph	
19	29	(German Empire) Alwin Boldt	2½ hp NSU 338cc	2	4	4:53.21	30.68 mph	
20	9	(United Kingdom) Rem Fowler	2¾ hp New Hudson 297cc	1	4	4:53.22	30.67 mph	
21	16	(Scotland) Alfie Alexander	2¾ hp Rex 339cc	2	4	5:00.27	29.95 mph	
DNF	25	(United Kingdom) Eddie Kickham	2¾ hp Douglas 340cc	2	3	Retired on last lap at Ballaugh due to magneto trouble.		
DNF	27	(German Empire) R. Dreschler	2½ hp NSU 299cc	1	3	Retired on last lap due punctures.		
DNF	30	(United Kingdom) Victor Wilberforce	2¾ hp Douglas 340cc	2	3	Retired on last lap due to seized gear at Snaefell.		
DNF	32	(United Kingdom) Charlie Collier	2hp Matchless-JAP 295cc	1	3	Retired on last lap due to punctures, plug and belt problems.		
DNF	1	(United Kingdom) Hugh Gibson	2¾ hp New Hudson 297cc	1	1	Retired on lap 2 at Glen Helen due to seized big end.		
DNF	7	(United Kingdom) Bert Colver	2¾ hp Enfield 340cc	2	1	Retired on lap 2 at Keppel Gate due to sheared sprocket.		
DNF	38	(United Kingdom) Jack Sirett	2½ hp NSU 338cc	1	1	Retired on lap 2 due multiple punctures.		
DNF	6	(France) Francois Sain	2 hp Alcyon 299cc	1	0	Retired on first lap due to jammed chain shortening device.		
DNF	8	(France) Michel Canale	2 hp Alcyon 299cc	1	0	Retired on first lap due to jammed chain shortening device.		
DNF	11	(United Kingdom) David C. Bolton	2 hp Martin 297cc	1	0	Retired on first lap at Ginger Hall (Sulby) due to broken frame.		
DNF	19	(United Kingdom) Harry Martin	2 hp Martin 297cc	1	0	Retired on first lap at Ballaugh due to broken valve lifter and throttle.		
DNF	35	(United Kingdom) Bob Bell	2 hp Moto-Reve 299cc	1	0	Retired on first lap due blown engine.		
DNF	37	(United Kingdom) Gordon Griffith	2¾ hp Moto-Reve 340cc	2	0	Retired on first lap at Ramsey due broken inlet pipe.		
DNS	22	(United Kingdom) Sydney T. Tessier	2¾ hp BAT 297cc	1				
DNS	3	(United Kingdom) Billy Heaton	2½ hp NSU 338cc	1		Smashed up his machine at the last moment.		
DNS	4	(United Kingdom) George E. Stanley	2½ hp Singer	1		Arrived too late to practice.		
DNS	20	(France) J. Garbero	2 hp Alcyon 299cc	1		Norman Slatter replaced him.		
DNS	34	(United Kingdom) George Ware	2¾ hp Humber 339cc	2		W.E. Grange replaced him.		
Fastest lap: Percy Evans, 53min. 24sec. 42.13 mph (New record)

== Senior TT final standings ==
Monday 3 July 1911 – 5 laps (187 miles (301 km)) Four Inch Course/Isle of Man TT Mountain Course

(Isle of Man) The 5th International Auto-cycle Tourist Trophy

Pos	#	Rider	Bike	Cyl.	Senior TT race classification			
Pos	#	Rider	Bike	Cyl.	Laps	Time	Speed	Prizes & remarks
1	26	(United Kingdom) Oliver Godfrey	3¾ hp Indian 584cc	2	5	3:56.10	47.63 mph	1st Prize - Winner of Senior Trophy and £40
2	17	(Republic of Ireland) Charles Franklin	3¾ hp Indian 584cc	2	5	3:59.52	46.90 mph	2nd Prize - £20.
3	31	(United Kingdom) Arthur Moorhouse	3¾ hp Indian 584cc	2	5	4:05.34	45.81 mph	3rd Prize - £10. First private owner
4	7	(United Kingdom) Harry Collier	4 hp Matchless-JAP 580cc	2	5	4:09.42		Gold Medal.
5	54	(United Kingdom) Hugh Mason	4 hp Matchless-JAP 580cc	2	5	4:15.35	45.05 mph	Gold Medal.
6	21	(Republic of Ireland) Joe Carvill	3½ hp Triumph 499cc	1	5	4:16.49	43.80 mph	First single-cylinder. Second private owner.
7	46	(United Kingdom) Harry Bashall	4 hp BAT-JAP 580cc	2	5	4:17.57	43.61 mph	Gold medal.
8	3	(Isle of Man) Quentin Smith	3½ hp Triumph 499cc	1	5	4:18.40	43.49 mph	Gold medal.
9	63	(United Kingdom) Howard Lister-Cooper	3½ hp Triumph 499cc	1	5	4:22.21		Gold medal.
10	49	(United Kingdom) John Bashall	4 hp BAT-JAP 580cc	2	5	4:24.56	42.88 mph	Gold medal.
11	14	(United Kingdom) Harry Reed	4 hp DOT-JAP 580cc	2	5	4:32.45	41.24 mph	Gold medal.
12	15	(United Kingdom) Billy Newsome	3½ hp Triumph 499cc	1	5	4:35.06	40.89 mph	Gold medal.
13	45	(United Kingdom) Charlie North	3½ hp Ariel 498cc	1	5	4:43.45	39.64 mph	
14	66	(United Kingdom) Percy Johnson	4 hp Matchless-JAP 580cc	2	5	4:44.37	39.52 mph	
15	4	(United Kingdom) Basil V Jones	3½ hp Premier 499cc	1	5	4:46.09	39.31 mph	
16	33	(United Kingdom) Peter Weatherilt	3½ hp Zenith-Gradua 499cc	1	5	4:46.37	39.21 mph	
17	58	(United Kingdom) Jack Haswell	3½ hp Triumph 499cc	1	5	4:51.46	38.55 mph	
18	55	(Scotland) Jimmy Alexander	3¾ hp Indian 584cc	2	5	4:58.01	37.74 mph	
19	61	(United Kingdom) Fred Mackay	3½ hp Singer 499cc	1	5	5:05.00	36.88 mph	
20	62	(United Kingdom) Norman F. Holder	4 hp Blumfield 583cc	2	5	5:05.26		
21	52	(United Kingdom) W. Stanhope Spencer	3½ hp Rudge 499cc	1	5	5:12.47	36.83 mph	
22	28	(United Kingdom) John Gibson	3½ hp Rudge 499cc	1	5	5:16.37		
23	32	(German Empire) Alwin Boldt	3½ hp NSU 499cc	1	5	5:21.58	35.53 mph	
24	11	(United Kingdom) Howard Smith	3½ hp Triumph 499cc	1	5	5:24.30		
25	51	(United Kingdom) Albert Berlie	4 hp Moto-Reve 499cc	2	5	5:36.51	33.39 mph	
26	12	(United Kingdom) Frank A Applebee jun.	4 hp Scott (2-stroke) 534cc	2	5	5:42.58	32.80 mph	
DQ	1	(United Kingdom) Charlie Collier	4 hp Matchless-JAP 580cc	2	5	3:57.13		Finished 2nd. Disqualified for taking petrol outside of depot.
DQ	43	(Canada) Jake DeRosier	3¾ hp Indian 584cc	2	5	4:29.41		Finished 11th. Disqualified for receiving assistance in repairing at Ramsey.
Fastest lap: Frank Phillip, 44min. 52sec. 50.14 mph (New record)
