= Humber motorcycles =

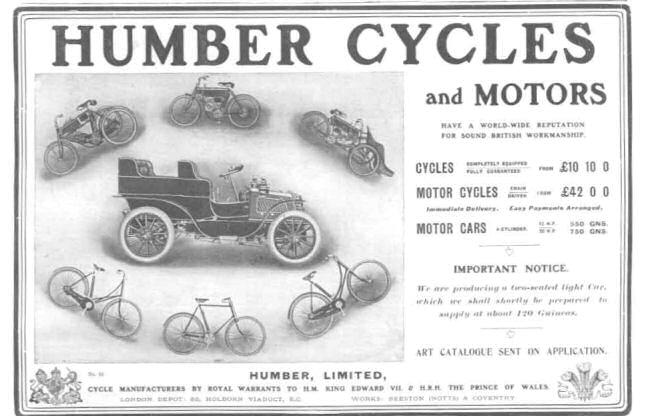
Humber advert from 1903

Humber Limited was a pioneering British motorcycle manufacturer. Humber produced the first practical motorcycle made in Britain by fitting one of their Humber bicycles with an E. J. Pennington two-horsepower motor in 1896.

Limited sales at the onset of the Great Depression in 1929 brought an end to their manufacture.

== History ==
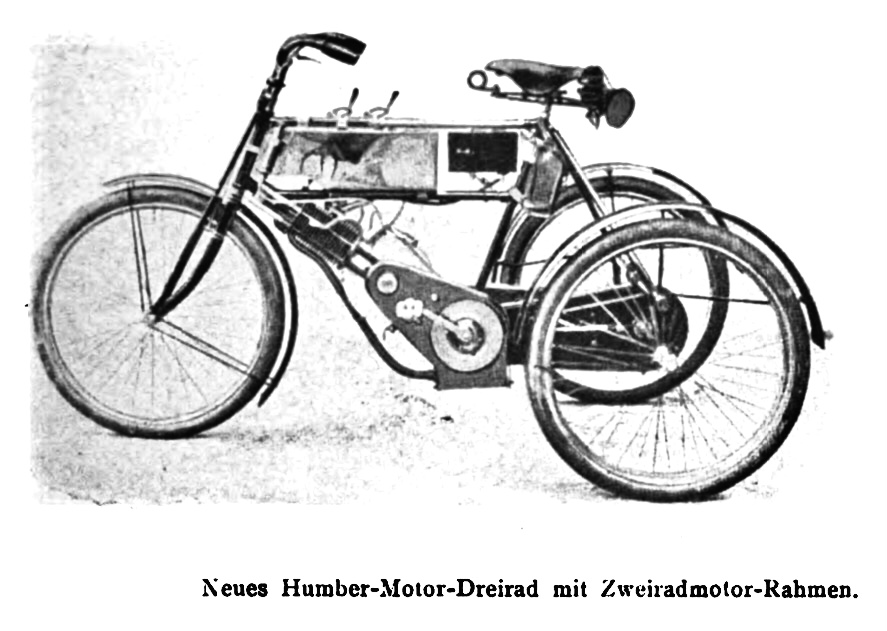
Humber tricycle (1902)

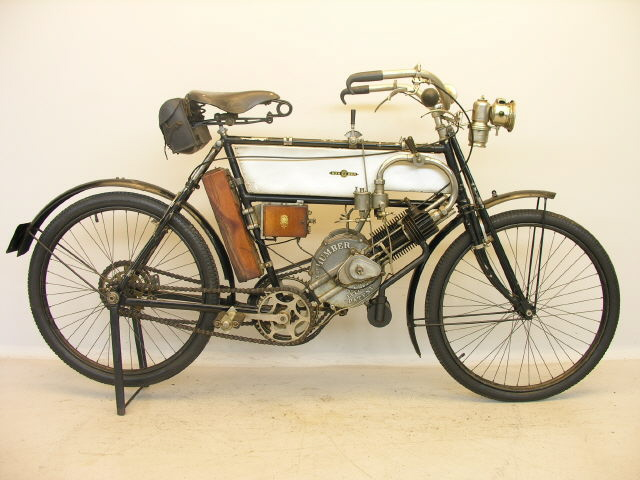
1904 Humber

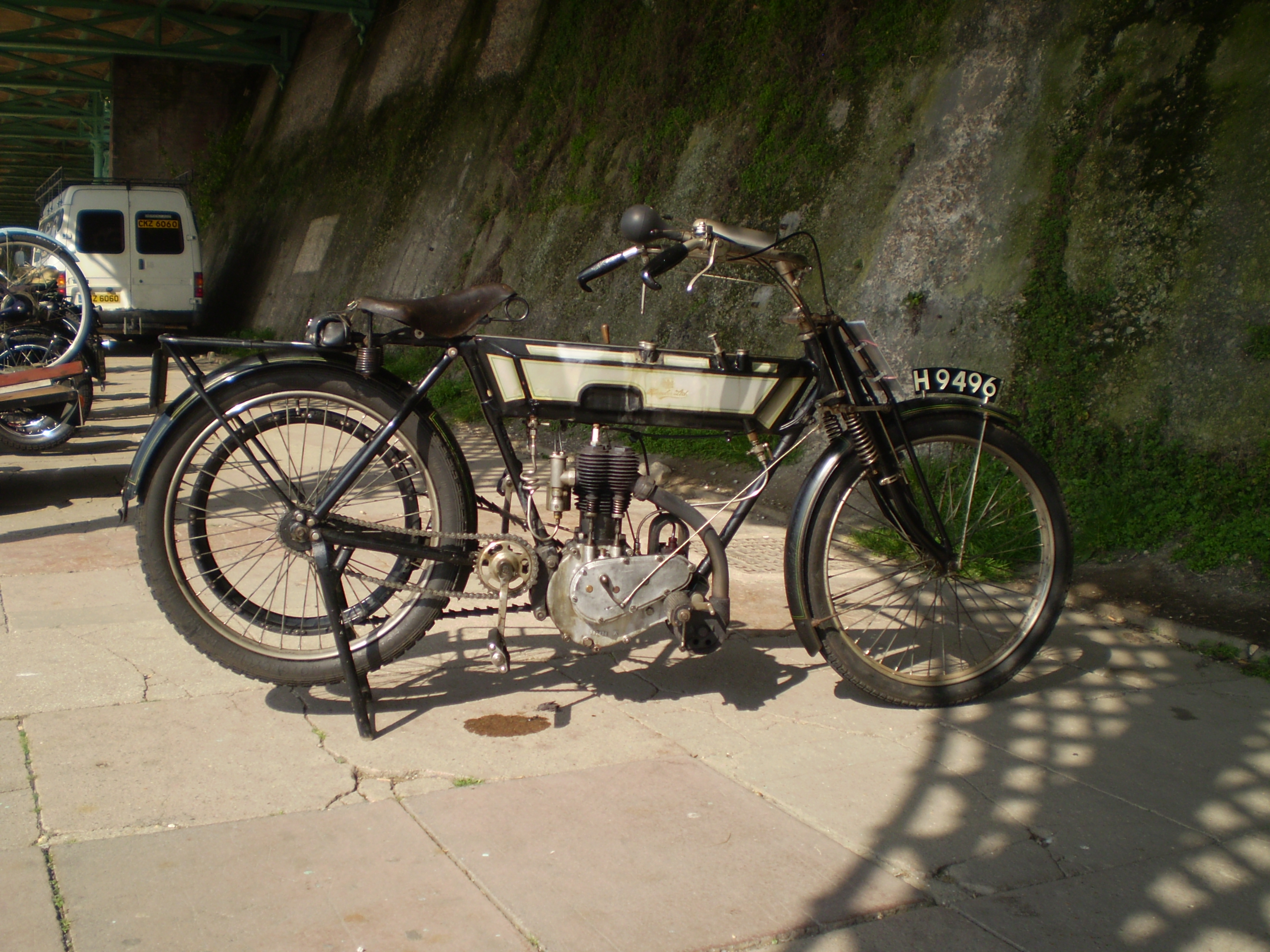
Humber single-cylinder 1914 (3377455512)

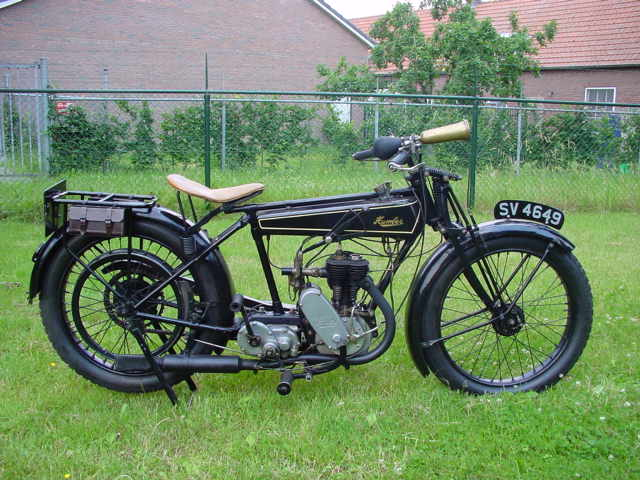
Humber 1925 234HP 1

On 10 July 1899 Bert Yates won a motorcycle race on his Humber motorcycle in Coventry in what he claimed was the first motorcycle race ever held on a track. This was in spite of problems with the ignition lamp going out (hot tube ignition). The engine was mounted on the right hand side of the rear wheel, with the crankshaft passing through the wheel and the flywheel on the left side and drive via an epicyclic gear in the hub (unlike the Pennington patented design had cylinders both sides with the bulk of the engine behind the rear wheel driving the rear wheel spindle directly). The machine in this 1899 race was later converted to electric ignition. According to Bert's account Humber sold 15 to 20 of these motorcycles. From the description and timing these would most likely be powered by De Dion-Bouton engines, as they started making their lightweight engine in 1896 - initially with hot tube ignition, and Humber collaborated with Harry Lawson (of New Beeston Cycle Co) who held a licence for the De Dion-Bouton engines. New Beeston Cycle Co had exhibited a De Dion-Bouton engined motorcycle at the Leeds Motor and Cycle Show in February 1897.

The next Humber motorcycle used a Minerva engine, and they built about 50 motorcycles with the engine inclined beneath the downtube. Minerva sold kits to allow engines to be attached to pedal bicycles below the front down tube, making this form of motorcycle very easy to produce.

By 1902 Humber had changed to a chain-driven motorcycle, which Bert Yates rode in various events with considerable success. These 2HP Humber motorcycles were built under licence to Phelon & Moore with a single-cylinder P&M engine and two-speed transmission. According to his account Humber stopped making motorcycles in 1906 as expanding car production meant they ran out of space in their current factory, but in 1908 Humber moved into a new factory and motorcycle production resumed, but this time using a home-built engine.

Humber launched their all new 3.5HP belt-driven motorcycle at the Stanley Show in 1908. This had an upright single-cylinder side-valve engine of 83mm bore and 90mm stroke (487cc), with mechanically operated valves, and Bosch magneto ignition. A 2-speed hub gear (Roc patent) was optional. Humber offered Roc patent epicyclic gears up to c1910, and were reported to have been involved in the development of the Wall Auto-Wheel for the holder of the ROC patents (Arthur Wall).

At the 1910 Olympia Show Humber continued with the 3.5HP model, but added a 2HP lightweight model. This had a single cylinder upright engine of 60mm bore and 70mm stroke (198cc). It was offered with an optional Armstrong 3-speed epicyclic gear, and had variable belt pulleys as well.

By the 1911 Olympia show a further model had been added, a 2.75 hp 45 degree V-twin, with bore and stroke of 60mm (340cc), the engine being identical to that of the Humber that competed and won the 1911 Junior TT. A 3-speed Armstrong epicyclic hub gear was optional. The fact that the stroke was as short as the bore (a so-called square engine when the norm was to have a longer stroke) was quite revolutionary. The same model range were exhibited at the 1912 show with only minor modifications. However at the 1913 show the 3.5HP was offered in both water-cooled and air-cooled forms, the water-cooled version stated to being more suited for sidecar work.

In 1913 Humber released details of a novel prototype motorcycle fitted with a unique engine in the form of an air-cooled in-line 6HP flat twin, but instead of a single rear cylinder it had two smaller cylinders with a common combustion chamber. It didn't go into production and wasn't shown at the Olympia show that year, but at the 1914 show Humber revealed that this prototype had evolved into a conventional 6HP water-cooled opposed twin with the cylinders in-line with the frame. The new machine came complete with a 3-speed gearbox, and a fully enclosed rear chain drive. At the same time they also offered a water-cooled version of their 3.5HP single intended for sidecar work.

Production of motorcycles ceased during WW1 and in a statement after the armistice they stated that it is not expected that more than one motorcycle will be marketed when they are able to devote more time to civil business, which would most likely be the 3.5HP air-cooled flat twin. They stuck to their promise, and the air-cooled 3.5HP in-line flat twin was the first motorcycle produced, and at the Olympia Show in November 1919 they released the more powerful 4HP (600cc) version.

The flat twin was the sole model until 1923, and while principally aimed at the sidecar market, a sports version with aluminium pistons was marketed as a solo, however in 1923 they launched a 350cc side valve single, and in 1927 the overhead valve (OHV) and overhead camshaft (OHC) versions of the same machine. The flat-twin was withdrawn fairly soon after the 350cc single was introduced in 1923. Production continued until 1930, after which Humber focussed on car production.

== Models ==
Model	Year	Notes
Humber	1898-1901	Originally hot tube ignition later electric (poss De Dion-Bouton)
Humber-Minerva	1902	Using Minerva clip on attachment to cycle frames
Humber Beeston	1902-1905	2.75HP Using P&M licensed engine
Humber 3.5HP	1908-1914	487cc side-valve single Humber (optionally water cooled in 1914)
Humber 2HP	1910-1914	198cc side-valve single Humber
Humber 2.75HP	1911-1914	340cc V twin Humber (won the 1911 Junior TT)
Humber 6HP 743cc	1914	Water-cooled flat twin
Humber 3.5HP	1919	Air-cooled flat twin
Humber 4HP/4.5HP 600cc	1919-1923	Air-cooled flat twin
Humber 2.75HP 350cc	1923-1930	Side Valve air-cooled single
Humber 350cc	1927-1930	OHV
Humber 350cc	1927-1930	OHC (Last Humber made)

== See also ==
- Humber Limited
- Humber cycles
