= New Hudson (company) =

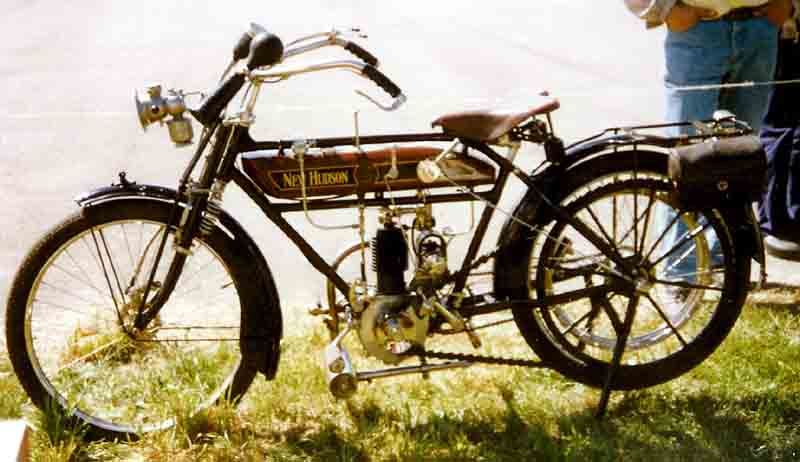
New Hudson

The New Hudson Cycle Co. was originally started in 1890 by George Patterson, and manufactured 'safety' bicycles in Birmingham. In 1903 they produced their first motorcycle, but times became tough for Patterson after one of his sons died in WW1 and the other lost a leg. The family sold the factory to HJ Bructon after WW1, and in 1920 the company was reformed as New Hudson Ltd.

New Hudson was taken over by BSA cycles in the late 1920s and by 1933 had ceased all production of motorcycles. In 1929 the company purchased the Girling brake patent from the inventor Albert Girling, to supply brake systems to Ford, Austin, Rover and Riley. The factory continued to produce Girling brakes and suspension components. In 1940 the New Hudson autocycle was produced but later rebadged as a BSA.

In 1943 New Hudson was purchased by Joseph Lucas Limited (including the Girling patent) and combined with Lucas's Bendix Brake interests, which Lucas had acquired in 1931, and Luvax Shock Absorber to form Girling Limited.

== Bicycles ==
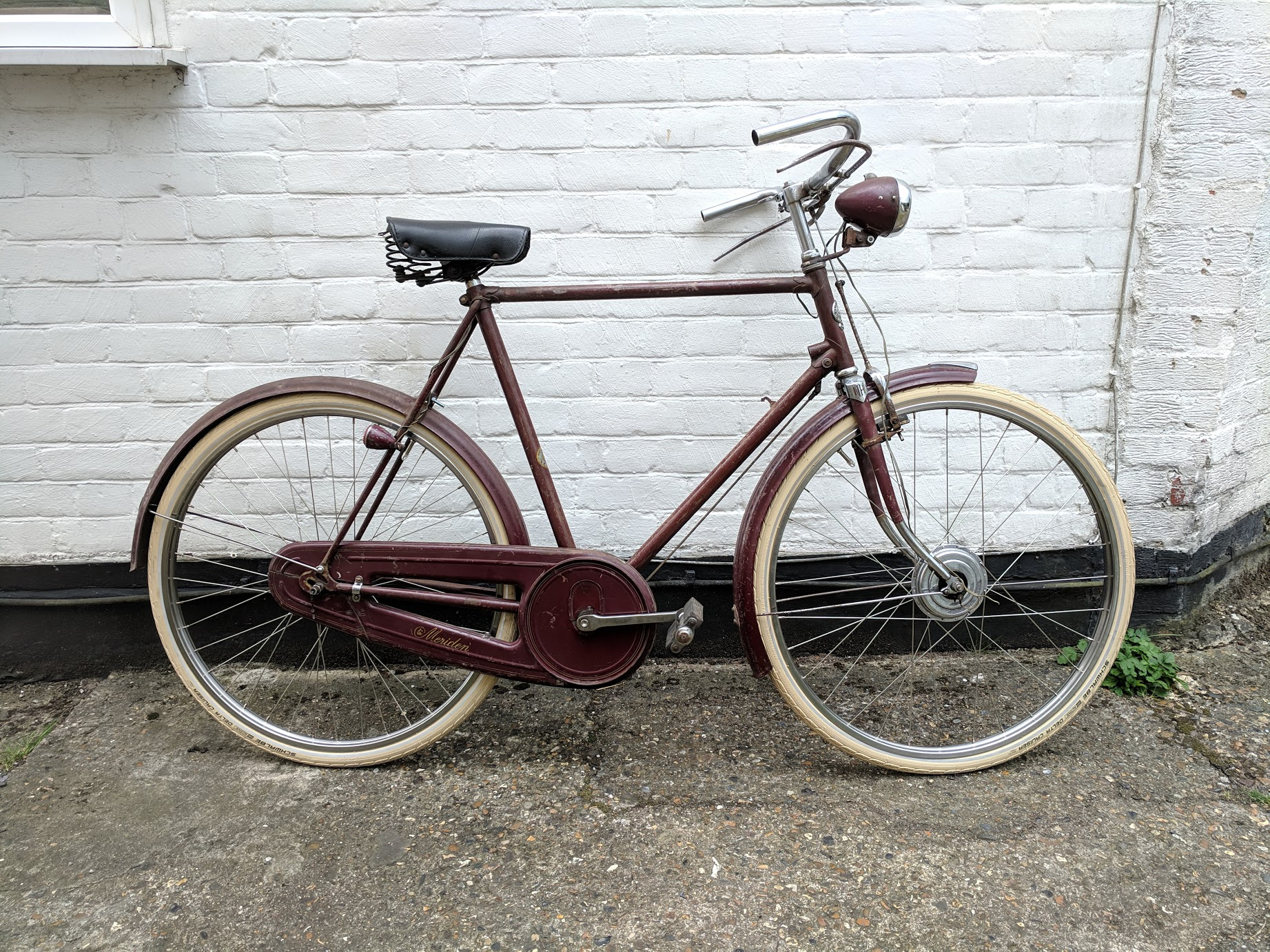
A 1954 BSA built New Hudson Meriden de Luze Tourist

New Hudson bicycles were produced in Birmingham, initially at the St George's Works, and latterly at BSA's Waverley Works.

Advertising by dealer, H. Fitzpatrick, in June 1907 mentioned the speed records achieved on New Hudson bicycles by Mr G Flint, including records for the 1/2 mile standing start, the 1/4 mile flying start, and the 1/4 mile flying start. On the back of this they were selling the New Hudson racer for £6 12s 6d. Other models for sale included :

- The New Hudson Modele Royale ladies model with triplex gear for £12 12s 0d
- The New Hudson Standard with patent steering lock for £9 9s 0d
- The New Hudson Semi-Racer for lightness, speed, and easy running for £6 18s 6d
- The New Hudson Ladies Popular for £7 14s 0d
- The New Hudson J.O.G. as used by Mr G.A.Olley in his record breaking ride from Land's End to John O'Groats in 3 days 20 hours 15 minutes £9 15s 0d

In 1908 a New Hudson agent's advert claimed that New Hudson bicycles were used by Welsh, Green and Flint in achieving their world records.

New Hudson supported the riders achieving records, and benefitted as a result, and this perspective was to be seen later with their motorcycles. While they made motorcycles the bicycle business was still thriving, and the number of different models was considerable.

By the 1950s, New Hudson bicycles were simply badge engineered versions of the BSA bicycle range. In 1957, when BSA was taken over by Raleigh Industries, New Hudson bicycles were too and remained in production - this time as re-badged Raleigh bicycles - until at least 1976.

== Motorcycles ==
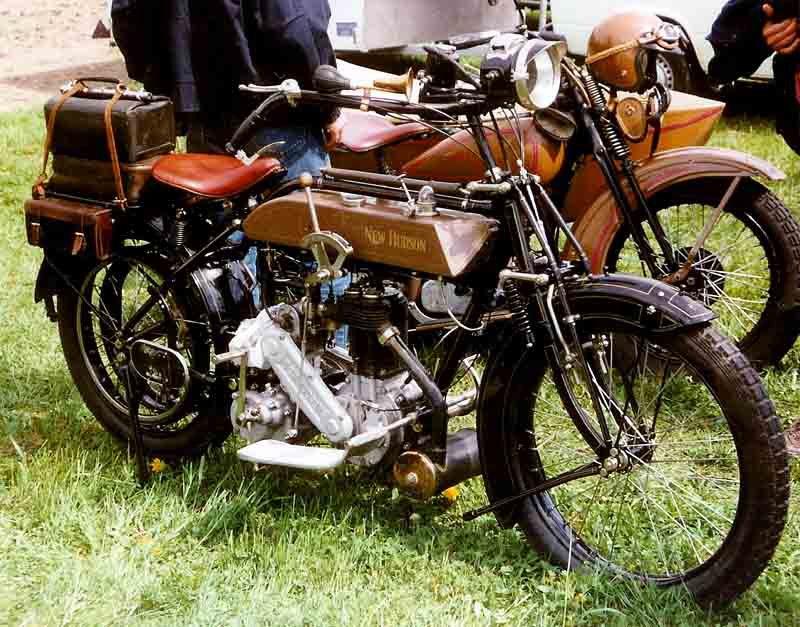
New Hudson 3,5-4 HP 500 cc SV 1914

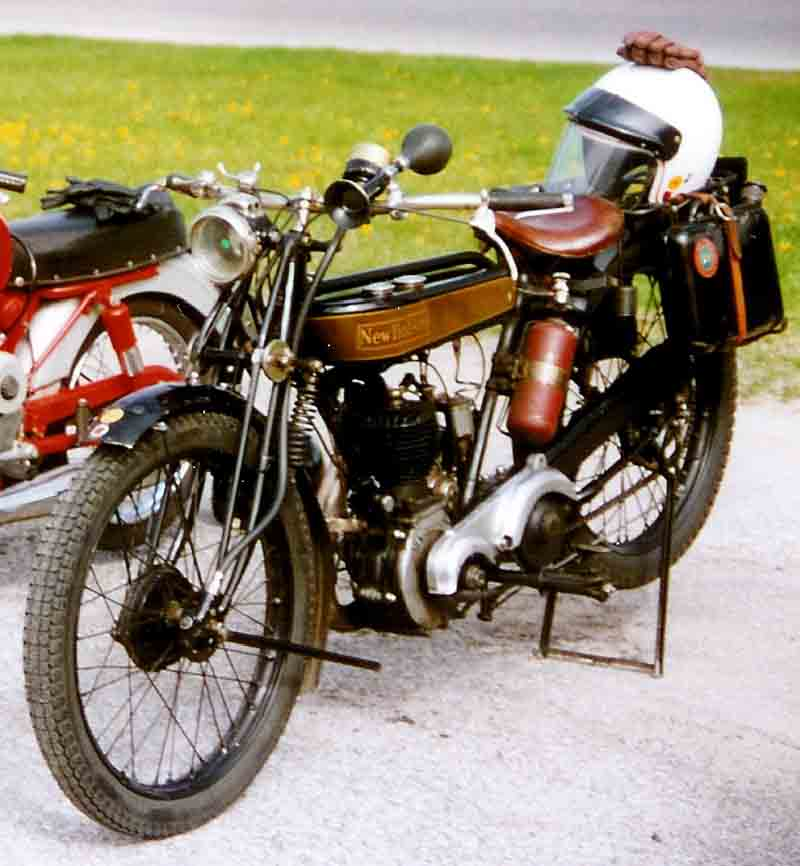
New Hudson 1924

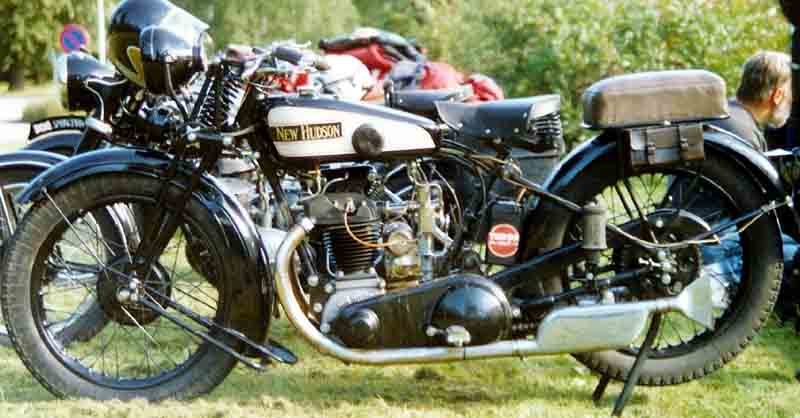
New Hudson 1929.jpg

New Hudson Cycle Co. launched their motorised bicycles at the annual Stanley Show in November 1902. Two motorcycles were exhibited, one with a De Dion-Bouton engine and another with a Minerva engine. Production seems short-lived as they went back to pure bicycle manufacture. Then around 1910 they started producing motorcycles again fitted with JAP engines, and in 1911 they attended the Olympia Motor Cycle show exhibiting their 3.5HP Colonial model (85mm bore, 88mm stroke), which had a single cylinder side valve engine of their own making, but was optionally available with a JAP engine, and they displayed a 2.5 hp model (70mm bore, 76mm stroke) which was fitted with a JAP engine. By the November 1913 show the range had been expanded to include a 211cc 2-stroke (62mm bore, 70mm stroke), as well as a military single cylinder model of 499cc, and their "Master Model Big Six", which was a motorcycle powered by a 50 degree V-twin of 770cc (76mm bore, 85mm stroke). The show report notes that "New Hudson Cycle Co were one of the first firms to fit, as standard, three-speed gears to motorcycles".

After WW1 they resumed motorcycle manufacture, but only with the single cylinder 2-stroke which they had originally introduced in 1914. Their adverts claimed it was "constructed throughout, including engine and gearbox, in the New Hudson works". A racing version of the 2-stroke was introduced for 1921, capable of 50 mph. At the 1921 Olympia show New Hudson unveiled their first 4-stroke since the war, a 4.5HP single cylinder sidecar outfit. The side-valve engine had a bore of 86mm and stroke of 100mm giving 594cc. The following year new side-valve 346cc and 498cc solo motorcycles were added to the range.

Their military model features in a full-page advert in the Motor Cycle paper of November 1914. where they claimed it had been supplied to "His Majesty's Forces, H.M. Postmaster General, and the Indian Expeditionary Force, also to The Russian Imperial Government, The French War Department, The Belgian Government, and the Italian Government".

By the late 1920s they were seeing success in speed trials and racing. On 13 August 1926 Bert le Vack got a world record at Brooklands on his 3.5HP New Hudson for the standing start 50 miles, at an average speed of 94.45 mph. Bert Le Vack, on a New Hudson, was also the first rider to complete a lap at over 100 mph on a 500cc machine at Brooklands. Jimmie Guthrie came second in the 1927 senior Isle of Man TT on a New Hudson twin-port OHV motorcycle, though he had to retire the New Hudson he rode in the Junior TT due to a fractured fuel pipe. Bert le Vack briefly worked for New Hudson after the J.A.P. racing department closed down in the late 1920s.

== Cyclecars ==
New Hudson introduced their first cyclecar at the November 1912 motorcycle show at Olympia. It was a 4-wheel car with an air-cooled engine costing 85 guineas. Production ceased during WW1, but in 1920 New Hudson launched their new three-wheel cyclecar complete with a new powerful engine of their own manufacture. The new engine was an air-cooled 50 degree V-twin, with a bore of 85mm and a stroke of 110mm giving 1250cc, it had overhead valves and was attached via a single-plate Ferodo clutch to a 3-speed (and reverse) gearbox. Final drive was by chain. By the 1921 Motor Cycle show the cyclecar had changed to using a water-cooled M.A.G. V-twin overhead valve engine with 82mm bore and 94mm stoke, giving 995cc.

The New Hudson cyclecar took part in a Motor Cycle review in November 1922, and by that time the M.A.G. engine was quoted as 1098cc. Complete with dynamo powered electric lighting and spare wheel, the cost was £230.

Model	Period	Cylinder	Capacity
4½ hp	1912–1914	1	737 cm^{3}
Tricycle	1919-1924	2 V	1250 cm^{3}

== See also ==
- List of motorcycles of the 1910s
- List of motorcycles of the 1920s
- List of car manufacturers of the United Kingdom
