= X Games Minneapolis 2018 =

Action sporting event (July 19–22, 2018)

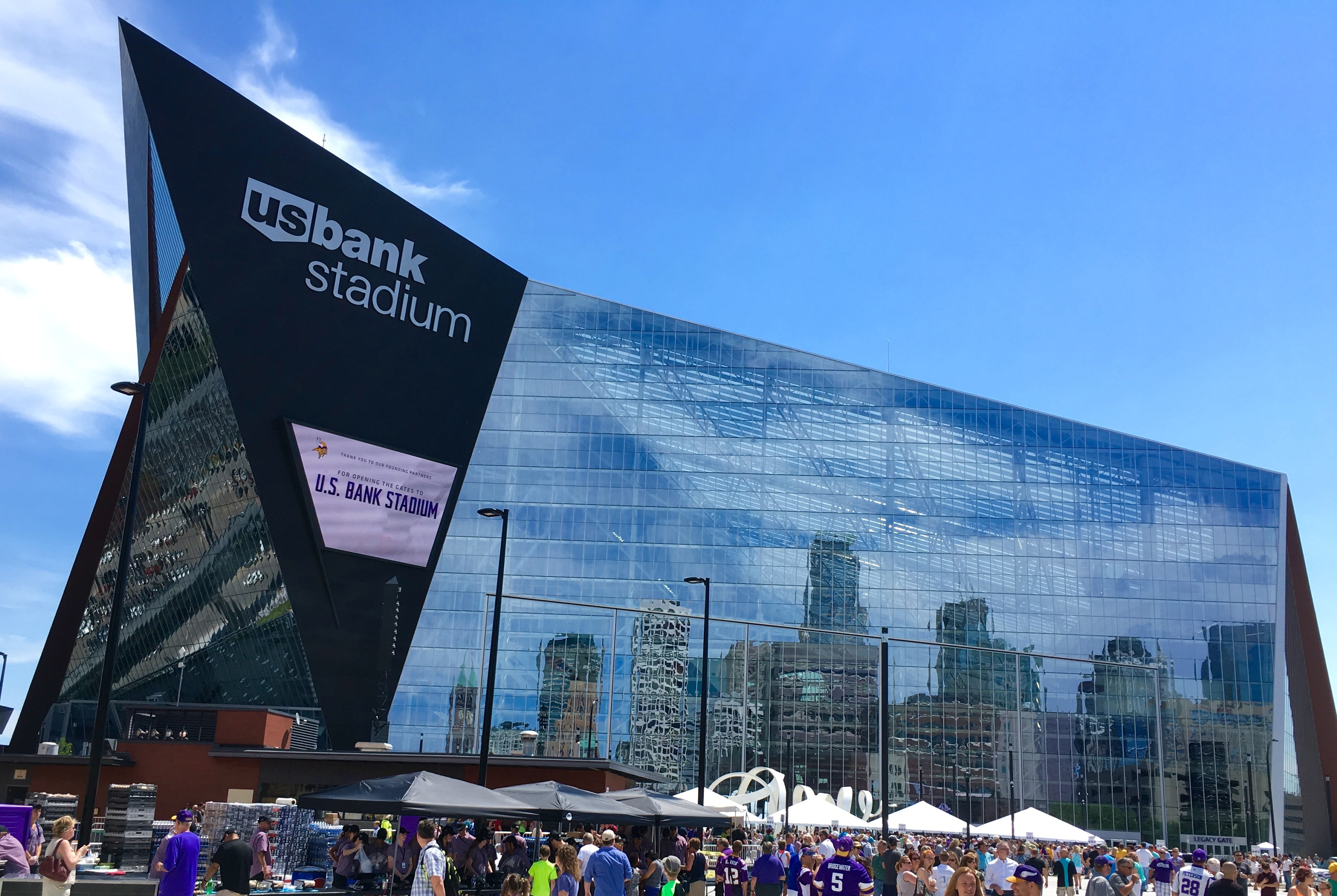
- Venue: U.S. Bank Stadium
- Location: Minneapolis, Minnesota
- Date: July 19–22

X Games Minneapolis 2018 was an action sporting event that took place July 19–22, 2018, at U.S. Bank Stadium in downtown Minneapolis, Minnesota.

== Medal count ==
* Host nation (Host)

Rank	Nation	Gold	Silver	Bronze	Total
1	United States (USA)*	12	10	13	35
2	Australia (AUS)	7	4	4	15
3	France (FRA)	1	1	0	2
4	Brazil (BRA)	1	0	2	3
5	Japan (JPN)	0	4	1	5
6	Czech Republic (CZE)	0	1	0	1
6	Great Britain (GBR)	0	1	0	1
8	Russia (RUS)	0	0	1	1
Totals (8 entries)		21	21	21	63

== Skateboard ==
Event	Gold		Silver		Bronze	
Pacífico Skateboard Vert	Jimmy Wilkins (USA)	89.00	Moto Shibata (JPN)	87.33	Mitchie Brusco (USA)	87.00
SoFi Women's Skateboard Street	Mariah Duran (USA)	87.66	Aori Nishimura (JPN)	86.00	Alexis Sablone (USA)	84.00
The Real Cost Skateboard Big Air	Mitchie Brusco (USA)	92.00	Clay Kreiner (USA)	91.00	Trey Wood (USA)	90.00
Monster Energy Men's Skateboard Street	Nyjah Huston (USA)	93.00	Jagger Eaton (USA)	90.33	Kelvin Hoefler (BRA)	89.66
Women's Skateboard Park	Brighton Zeuner (USA)	90.33	Sabre Norris (AUS)	85.33	Sakura Yosozumi (JPN)	82.33
Toyota Men's Skateboard Park	Alex Sorgente (USA)	89.00	Tristan Rennie (USA)	87.66	Tom Schaar (USA)	85.33
Next X Skateboard Street	Giovanni Vianna (BRA)	90.33	Keyaki Ike (JPN)	86.00	Marcos Montoya (USA)	85.00
Next X Skateboard Park	Liam Pace (USA)	87.00	Gavin Bottger (USA)	83.66	Luiz Francisco (BRA)	80.00

== BMX ==
Event	Gold		Silver		Bronze	
Pacífico BMX Vert	Vince Byron (AUS)	91.00	Jamie Bestwick (GBR)	88.00	Zach Newman (USA)	84.00
BMX Street	Chad Kerley (USA)	92.33	Garrett Reynolds (USA)	91.33	Devon Smillie (USA)	88.66
The Real Cost BMX Big Air	James Foster (USA)	89.33	Morgan Wade (USA)	87.66	Vince Byron (AUS)	85.66
Toyota BMX Park	Logan Martin (AUS)		Dennis Enarson (USA)		Kyle Baldock (AUS)	
Fruit of the Loom BMX Dirt	Brandon Loupos (AUS)	95.00	Logan Martin (AUS)	94.00	Brian Fox (USA)	92.33
Dave Mirra's BMX Park Best Trick	Alex Hiam (AUS)	90.66	Logan Martin (AUS)	87.66	Alex Nikulin (RUS)	87.66

== Moto X ==
Event	Gold		Silver		Bronze	
X Games Harley-Davidson Flat-Track Racing	Jared Mees (USA)		Briar Bauman (USA)		Jake Johnson (USA)	
Harley-Davidson Hooligan Racing	Daniel Mischler (USA)		Jimmy Hill (USA)		Benny Carlson (USA)	
Moto X Freestyle	Tom Pagès (FRA)	92.33	Jackson Strong (AUS)	90.00	Rob Adelberg (AUS)	88.66
LifeProof Moto X Step Up	Jarryd McNeil (AUS)	43'	Libor Podmol (CZE)	41'	Colby Raha (USA)	41′
Moto X Best Whip	Jarryd McNeil (AUS)	91.66	Genki Watanabe (JPN)	91.33	Axell Hodges (USA)	90.33
Monster Energy Moto X Best Trick	Jackson Strong (AUS)	93.00	Tom Pagès (FRA)	91.66	Rob Adelberg (AUS)	91.00
Moto X Quarterpipe High Air	Axell Hodges (USA)	34'3″	Colby Raha (USA)	33′2″	Tyler Bereman (USA)	29′9″
