= Superprestigio of the Americas =

Superprestigio of the Americas was an indoor flat track motorcycle race held on 21 November 2015 at the Orleans Hotel & Casino in Las Vegas, Nevada, United States. It was an invitational event that pitted motorcycle racers from various racing disciplines (Road racing, Freestyle, Hillclimb, and Flat Track) against many of the best racers from the AMA Pro Racing Flat Track Championship series.

The race was broadcast live on fanschoice.tv and was produced for national broadcast on NBC Sports Network the following Sunday, 29 November.

== Competitors ==
=== AMA pro-racing flat-track invitations ===
Selected for their points standings or specific race accomplishments in the AMA Pro Racing Flat Track Championship were Brad Baker, Briar Bauman, Dan Bromley, Stevie Bonsey, Kenny Coolbeth, Davis Fisher, Sammy Halbert, Jesse Janisch, Jake Johnson, Justin Jones, Doug Lawrence, Andrew Luker, Jared Mees, Bryan Smith, Jarod Vanderkooi and Henry Wiles

=== All-star invitations ===
Selected from various motorcycle disciplines were:
Oliver Brindley, DTRA Dirt Track
Aaron Colton, XDL Sportbike Freestyle Championship
Toni Elias, MotoGP
Jake Gagne, AMA Superbike Championship
Roger Hayden, AMA Superbike Championship
Josh Hayes, AMA Superbike Championship
Taylor Knapp, AMA Superbike Championship
Phil Libhart, AMA Pro Hillclimb
Gage McAllister, AMA Superbike Championship
Larry Pegram, AMA Superbike Championship
Dani Ribalta, Endurance FIM World Championship
Joe Roberts, AMA Superbike Championship
Franc Serra, FIM Flat Track Cup
Anthony West, MotoGP
Blake Young, AMA Superbike Championship

Competitors ranged in age from 17-year-old Oliver Brindley to 43-year-old Phil Libhart.

== Sanction, rules and construction ==
Superprestigio of the Americas was sanctioned by AMA Pro Racing and overseen by the Fédération Internationale de Motocyclisme by Stuart Higgs as race director.

Motorcycle equipment rules were as per AMA Pro Flat Track GNC1 Singles, except that all machines were ha 19" Mitas tires.

The track was designed by the 7-times AMA Grand National Championship winner, Chris Carr who designated that the track have an American football-shape infield in order to produce multiple racing lines and therefore more competition. The track was built in two layers with a base of clay/rock mix as a foundation with decomposed granite for the racing surface. Track construction was done by the renowned track builder Dennis Pearson. A motocross-style starting gate (rather uncommon for flat track racing) was used.

== Competition ==
A points system was used to award finishers in the heat races the opportunity to choose their starting positions for the semifinals. Points were awarded as follows: 10 points for 1st place, 7 for 2nd, 5 for 3rd, 3 for 4th, 2 for 5th and 1 for 6th.

Finishing positions in semifinals and Last Chance Qualifiers determined eligibility and starting positions for Finals.

Roland Sands Designs and Indian Motorcycles brought the Super Hooligans as a supporting class.

In a format designed to intensify the action, there were 31 races run during the program.

Road racing World Champion Kevin Schwantz, a former amateur flat tracker himself, was the grand marshal for the event.

The winner of the Superprestigio of the Americas, Jared Mees, was awarded a custom gold and diamond ring from Thom Duma Fine Jewelers. The podium finishers, Mees, Brad Baker and Kenny Coolbeth, are all former GNC Championship winners.

== Results ==
=== All-stars final ===
Pos	No.	Rider	Manufacturer
1	72	United States Larry Pegram	Honda
2	95	United States Roger Hayden	Suzuki
3	27E	United States Joe Roberts	Yamaha
4	24I	United Kingdom Oliver Brindley	Kawasaki
5	18	Spain Franc Serra	KTM
6	13	Australia Anthony West	Suzuki
7	15	Spain Dani Ribalta	KTM
8	93	United States Aaron Colton	Honda

=== Flat Track Final ===
Pos	No.	Rider	Manufacturer
1	6	United States Brad Baker	Honda
2	1	United States Jared Mees	Honda
3	2	United States Kenny Coolbeth, Jr.	Honda]
4	42	United States Bryan Smith	Kawasaki
5	14	United States Briar Bauman	Honda
6	67M	United States Davis Fisher	Honda
7	80	United States Stevie Bonsey	Suzuki
8	93	United States Dan Bromley	Honda

=== Superprestigio of the Americas ===
Pos	No.	Rider	Manufacturer
1	1	United States Jared Mees	Honda
2	6	United States Brad Baker	Honda
3	2	United States Kenny Coolbeth, Jr.	Honda
4	72	United States Larry Pegram	Honda
5	27E	United States Joe Roberts	Yamaha
6	24I	United Kingdom Oliver Brindley	Kawasaki
7	95	United States Roger Hayden	KTM
8	42	United States Bryan Smith	Kawasaki

=== Super Hooligans Final ===
Pos	No.	Rider	Manufacturer
1	14	United States Thor Drake	Harley-Davidson
2	9	United States Chris Wiggins	Harley-Davidson
3	10	United States Roland Sands	Indian
4	18	United States Hunter Klee	Harley-Davidson
5	31	United States Drake McElroy	Indian
6	47	United States Travis Newbold	Indian
7	56	United States Ben Giese	Yamaha
8	23	United States Brendon Lutes	Indian
9	66	United States Shaun Guardado	Harley-Davidson
10	74	United States Helder Alvernaz	Harley-Davidson
