= X Games Harley-Davidson Flat-Track =

X Games Harley-Davidson Flat-Track racing was an event for the ESPN Summer X Games held in Austin, Texas, first held on June 4, 2015. Flat-Track racing returned to X Games for 2016 in Austin on Thursday, June 2, 2016.

The 2015 event had a very rough track due to torrential rains, but was still very well received by the public and press.

== Competition Rules ==
The 2015 event utilized AMA Pro Flat Track GNC1 equipment rules as they apply to twin-cylinder motorcycles. Differing from standard AMA rules were the use of a motocross-style starting gate and the size of the track was considerably smaller than is usually used for the twin-cylinder motorcycles (normally reserved for use on half-mile and mile tracks).

== 2015 invited Athletes ==
(United States) Jared Mees
(United States) Johnny Lewis
(United States) Brad Baker
(United States) Sammy Halbert
(Canada) Doug Lawrence
(United States) Jake Johnson
(United States) Cory Texter
(United States) Bryan Smith
(United States) Jake Shoemaker
(United States) Danny Eslick
(United States) Briar Bauman
(United States) Mikey Martin
(United States) Stevie Bonsey
(United States) Kyle Johnson
(United States) Robert Pearson
(United States) Wyatt Maguire
(United States) Jarod Vanderkooi
(United States) Chad Cose
(United States) Kenny Coolbeth
(Australia) Michael Kirkness
(United States) Brandon Robinson
(United States) Nichole Mees
(United States) Mikey Rush
(United States) Shayna Texter

== 2015 Results ==
=== Flat-Track Final ===
Pos	No.	Rider	Motorcycle
1	42	(United States) Bryan Smith	Crosley Radio Kawasaki Ninja 650R
2	69	(United States) Sammy Halbert	Briggs Auto Harley-Davidson XR-750
3	6	(United States) Brad Baker	Factory Harley-Davidson XR-750
4	10	(United States) Johnny Lewis	Lloyd Brothers Motorsports Ducati Scrambler
5	5	(United States) Jake Johnson	Hart Racing Kawasaki Ninja 650R
6	14	(United States) Briar Bauman	Hart Racing Kawasaki Ninja 650R
7	69	(Canada) Doug Lawrence	Harley-Davidson XR-750
8	6	(United States) Mikey Martin	Harley-Davidson XR-750
9	10	(United States) Kenny Coolbeth	Harley-Davidson XR-750
10	7	(Australia) Michael Kirkness	Kawasaki Ninja 650R
11	10	(United States) Jared Mees	Harley-Davidson XR-750
12	7	(United States) Brandon Robinson	Kawasaki Ninja 650R

== 2016 X Games Harley-Davidson Flat-Track ==
The 2016 event was held at the recently constructed flat track at the Circuit of the Americas on June 2, 2016. The X Games were broadcast live on ESPN and streamed on WatchESPN.com.

== 2016 invited Athletes ==
(United States) Brad Baker--#6 Harley-Davidson
(United States) Briar Bauman--#14 Kawasaki Ninja 650R
(United States) Stevie Bonsey--#80 Harley-Davidson
(United States) Jeffrey Carver, Jr.--#23 Kawasaki Ninja 650R
(United States) Dominic Colindres--#66 Yamaha FZ-07
(United States) Kenny Coolbeth--#2 Harley-Davidson
(United States) Chad Cose--#49 Kawasaki Ninja 650R
(United States) Davis Fisher--#67 Harley-Davidson
(United States) Sammy Halbert--#69 Harley-Davidson
(United States) Jake Johnson--#5 H-D Motor Company Classic H-D Rinehart Racing Harley-Davidson
(Australia) Michael Kirkness--#87 Harley-Davidson
(United States) Kayl Kolkman--#98 Kawasaki Ninja 650R
(Canada) Doug Lawrence--#73 Harley-Davidson
(United States) Johnny Lewis--#10 Lloyd Brothers Motorsports LBM-DT16
(United States) Wyatt Maguire--#16 Harley-Davidson
(United States) Mikey Martin--#91 Harley-Davidson
(United States) Jared Mees--#9 Rogers Racing Las Vegas H-D SDI Harley-Davidson
(United States) Robert Pearson--#27 Harley-Davidson
(United States) Larry Pegram--#72 Harley-Davidson
(United States) Brandon Robinson--#44 Harley-Davidson
(United States) Jake Shoemaker--#55 Triumph Bonneville
(United States) Bryan Smith--#1 Kawasaki Ninja 650R
(United States) Cory Texter--#65 Cory Texter Racing CTR Kawasaki Ninja 650R
(United States) Jarod Vanderkooi--#20 Kawasaki Ninja 650R
(United States) Henry Wiles--#17 Kawasaki Ninja 650R

== 2016 Results ==
=== Flat-Track Final ===
Pos	No.	Rider	Motorcycle
1	9	(United States) Jared Mees	Rogers Racing Harley-Davidson XR-750
2	2	(United States) Kenny Coolbeth	Zanotti Racing Harley-Davidson XR-750
3	6	(United States) Brad Baker	Harley-Davidson Motor Company Harley-Davidson XR-750
4	5	(United States) Jake Johnson	Harley-Davidson Motor Company Harley-Davidson XR-750
5	87	(Australia) Michael Kirkness	Nitro Civil Harley-Davidson XR-750
6	44	(United States) Brandon Robinson	Kennedy Racing Harley-Davidson XR-750
7	10	(United States) Johnny Lewis	Lloyd Brothers Motorsports LBM DT-16
8	67	(United States) Davis Fisher	Harley-Davidson Motor Company Harley-Davidson XG750R
9	23	(United States) Jeffrey Carver, Jr.	Goodwin Racing Harley-Davidson XR-750
10	55	(United States) Jake Shoemaker	Bonneville Performance Triumph Bonneville
11	10	(United States) Bryan Smith	Crosley Brands Kawasaki Ninja 650R
12	7	(United States) Sammy Halbert	BriggsAuto.com Harley-Davidson XR-750

== 2017 X Games Harley-Davidson Flat-Track ==
The 2017 event will be held in Minnesota on July 13, 2017. The X Games will be broadcast live on ESPN and streamed on WatchESPN.com.

== 2017 invited Athletes ==
(United States) Brad Baker--#6 Harley-Davidson
(United States) Briar Bauman--#14 Kawasaki Ninja 650R
(United States) Stevie Bonsey--#80 Harley-Davidson
(United States) Jeffrey Carver, Jr.--#23 Kawasaki Ninja 650R
(United States) Dominic Colindres--#66 Yamaha FZ-07
(United States) Kenny Coolbeth--#2 Harley-Davidson
(United States) Chad Cose--#49 Kawasaki Ninja 650R
(United States) Davis Fisher--#67 Harley-Davidson
(United States) Sammy Halbert--#69 Harley-Davidson
(United States) Jake Johnson--#5 H-D Motor Company Classic H-D Rinehart Racing Harley-Davidson
(Australia) Michael Kirkness--#87 Harley-Davidson
(United States) Kayl Kolkman--#98 Kawasaki Ninja 650R
(Canada) Doug Lawrence--#73 Harley-Davidson
(United States) Johnny Lewis--#10 Lloyd Brothers Motorsports LBM-DT16
(United States) Wyatt Maguire--#16 Harley-Davidson
(United States) Mikey Martin--#91 Harley-Davidson
(United States) Jared Mees--#9 Rogers Racing Las Vegas H-D SDI Harley-Davidson
(United States) Robert Pearson--#27 Harley-Davidson
(United States) Larry Pegram--#72 Harley-Davidson
(United States) Brandon Robinson--#44 Harley-Davidson
(United States) Jake Shoemaker--#55 Triumph Bonneville
(United States) Bryan Smith--#1 Kawasaki Ninja 650R
(United States) Cory Texter--#65 Cory Texter Racing CTR Kawasaki Ninja 650R
(United States) Jarod Vanderkooi--#20 Kawasaki Ninja 650R
(United States) Henry Wiles--#17 Kawasaki Ninja 650R

== 2017 Results ==
=== Flat-Track Final ===
Pos	No.	Rider	Motorcycle
1	9	(United States) Jared Mees	Rogers Racing Harley-Davidson XR-750
2	2	(United States) Kenny Coolbeth	Zanotti Racing Harley-Davidson XR-750
3	6	(United States) Brad Baker	Harley-Davidson Motor Company Harley-Davidson XR-750
4	5	(United States) Jake Johnson	Harley-Davidson Motor Company Harley-Davidson XR-750
5	87	(Australia) Michael Kirkness	Nitro Civil Harley-Davidson XR-750
6	44	(United States) Brandon Robinson	Kennedy Racing Harley-Davidson XR-750
7	10	(United States) Johnny Lewis	Lloyd Brothers Motorsports LBM DT-16
8	67	(United States) Davis Fisher	Harley-Davidson Motor Company Harley-Davidson XG750R
9	23	(United States) Jeffrey Carver, Jr.	Goodwin Racing Harley-Davidson XR-750
10	55	(United States) Jake Shoemaker	Bonneville Performance Triumph Bonneville
11	10	(United States) Bryan Smith	Crosley Brands Kawasaki Ninja 650R
12	7	(United States) Sammy Halbert	BriggsAuto.com Harley-Davidson XR-750
