= Henry Wiles =

American motorcycle racer

- Henry Wiles, Sturgis TT, August 6, 2017
- Born: March 11, 1984 (age 42); Winn, Michigan, U.S.
- Current team: DPC Racing Kawasaki Ninja 650R
- Bike number: 17

Henry Wiles (born March 11, 1984) is an American Flat Track racer from the United States who has competed in the championship since 2003, winning the Peoria TT event a record 14 times in a row, 2004 through 2018. He is married to Kristen Overfield (Wiles) as of October 2019.

== American Flat Track ==
Henry Wiles racing at the Sturgis TT 2017

Wiles began racing in the American Flat Track Series (then known as AMA Pro Flat Track) in 2003. That year he finished seventh at the Peoria TT. Starting in 2004, he won the event every year it took place (it was rained out in 2007) for 14 consecutive victories through 2018, beating Chris Carr's record of 13 (non-consecutive) wins overall at the historic track. Due to injury, Wiles missed the event in 2019 (won by Briar Bauman) bringing his streak to an end.

== X Games Harley-Davidson Flat-Track ==
Wiles competed in the 2016 X Games Harley-Davidson Flat-Track, placing 14th in the final aboard his Kawasaki Ninja 650R.

== Superprestigio of the Americas ==
Wiles was invited to participate in the inaugural Superprestigio of the Americas. He placed fourth in the Last Chance Qualifier and did not advance to the finals aboard his Honda CRF450R.

== Troy Bayliss Classic ==
Wiles placed fourth in the 2014 Troy Bayliss Classic held on January 18, 2014 at the Taree Motorcycle Club in Pampoolah, New South Wales, Australia. Second in 2015, held on January 19. Participated in the heats in the 2016 round, but the finals were rained out. Invited to the 2017 event.

== Career highlights ==
- 14 consecutive wins at the Peoria TT, 2004–2018 (the event was rained out in 2007)
