= Jake Johnson (motorcyclist) =

American motorcycle racer (born 1984)

- Jake Johnson, Calistoga Half-Mile, July 29, 2017
- Nationality: American
- Born: July 17, 1984 (age 42); Camden, New Jersey, United States
- Current team: Factory Harley-Davidson XG750R
- Bike number: 5

Jake Johnson is an AMA Pro Flat Track Racer from the United States who has competed in the Championship since 2002, winning the Grand National Singles Championship in 2006 and the AMA Pro Grand National Championship in 2010 and 2011.

== X Games Harley-Davidson Flat-Track ==
Johnson competed in the 2015 X Games Harley-Davidson Flat-Track, qualifying first in his heat, and finishing in fifth behind winner Bryan Smith.

== Superprestigio of the Americas ==
Johnson was invited to participate in the inaugural Superprestigio of the Americas. He competed in Semifinal 1, but did not proceed to the final.

== Career highlights ==
- 2002- AMA Flat Track Rookie of the Year Harley-Davidson XR-750
- 2006- AMA Grand National Singles Champion Suzuki RM-Z450
- 2008- AMA Grand National Singles Champion Suzuki RM-Z450
- 2010- AMA Grand National Champion, AMA Flat Track Twins Champion Zanotti Racing Harley-Davidson XR-750
- 2011- AMA Grand National Champion Zanotti Racing Harley-Davidson XR-750
- 2012- TKTKT, AMA Grand National Championship Zanotti Racing Harley-DaviTKdson XR-750
- 2013- 7th, AMA Grand National Championship Lloyd Brothers Motorsports Ducati
- 2014- 3rd, AMA Grand National Championship Lloyd Brothers Motorsports Kawasaki
- 2015- 11th, AMA Grand National Championship Hart Racing Kawasaki Ninja 650R and KX450F

Preceded by Not Awarded	AMA Pro Flat Track Champion; 2011	Succeeded by Jared Mees
