= Davis Fisher =

American motorcycle racer

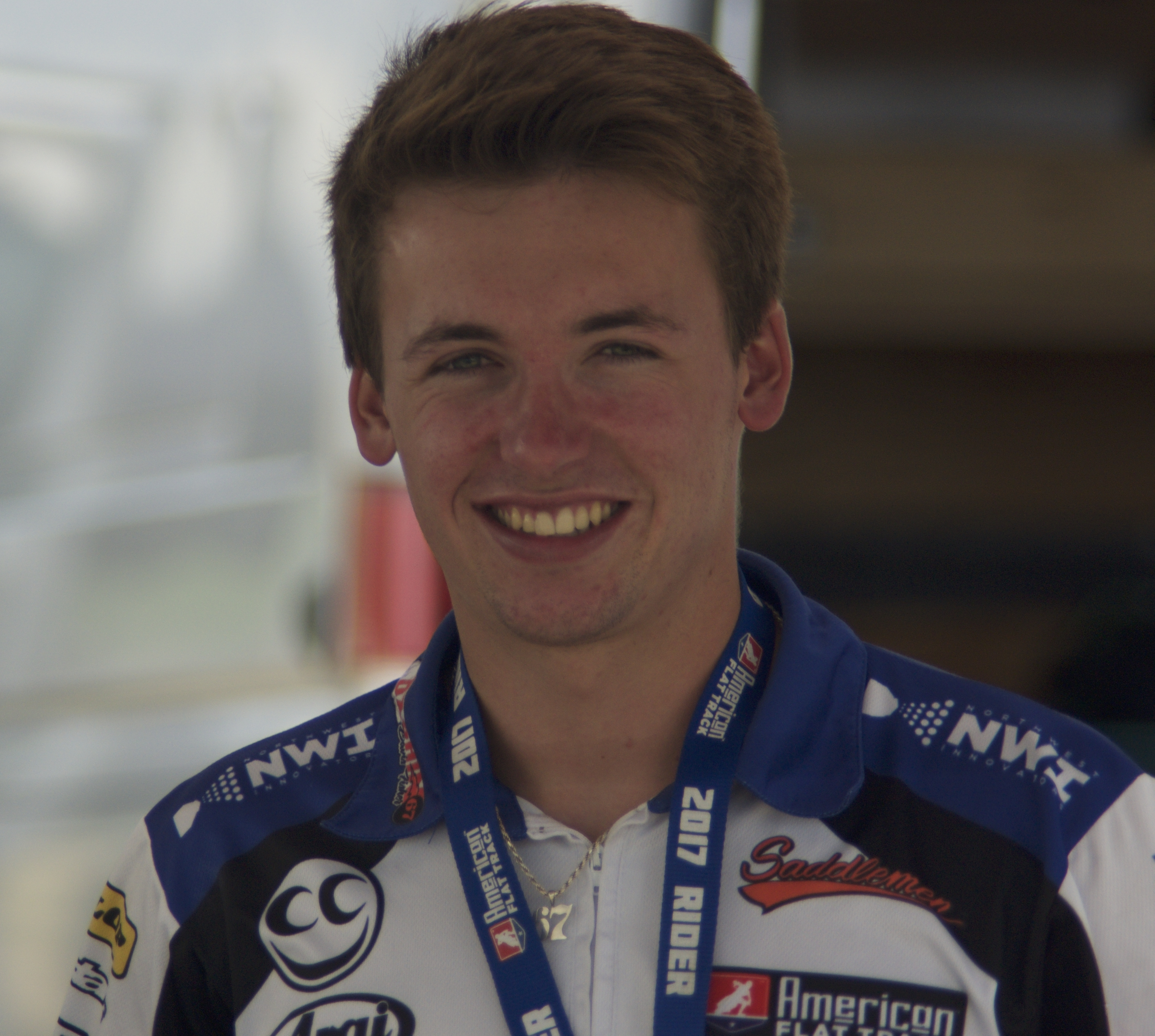
- Fisher at Calistoga Half-Mile, 2017
- Born: November 21, 1997 (age 28); Warren, Oregon, U.S.
- Current team: Bob Lanphere Beaverton Motorcycles Kawasaki Ninja 650R
- Bike number: 67

Davis Fisher (born November 21, 1997) is an American professional motorcycle racer. He competes in the AMA Pro Flat Track championship since 2014, winning the GNC2 championship in 2015 and competing in the GNC1 Championship in 2016.

== AMA Pro Flat Track ==
Davis Fisher (67) with Brandon Robinson at the Sturgis TT 2017.

Fisher raced in the AMA Pro Flat Track Series beginning in 2014 at the age of just 16. He scored TK wins and TKT podiums in his rookie year, finishing the championship in second place, just one point shy of Champion Kyle Johnson.

In 2015, Fisher clinched the GNC2 championship with two rounds remaining. Aside from three mechanical DNFs, he placed no lower than second in any of the races for the season.

== X Games Harley-Davidson Flat-Track ==
Fisher competed in the 2016 X Games Harley-Davidson Flat-Track, qualifying 17th in practice, placing third in his heat race, and placing eighth in the final—all aboard his Harley-Davidson XG750R.

== Superprestigio of the Americas ==
Fisher was invited to participate in the inaugural Superprestigio of the Americas. He placed sixth in the Final aboard his Honda CRF450R.

== Career highlights ==
- 2014– 2nd, AMA GNC2 Championship Parkinson Brothers Racing CRF450R
- 2015– AMA GNC2 Champion Parkinson Brothers Racing CRF450R

Preceded by Kyle Johnson	AMA Pro Flat Track GNC2 Champion; 2015	Succeeded by Kolby Carlile
