= Springsteen (disambiguation) =

Bruce Springsteen (born 1949) is an American singer and songwriter.

Springsteen may also refer to:

- Alana Springsteen, American singer and songwriter
- Devo Springsteen (born 1977), American record producer and songwriter
- Jay Springsteen (born 1957), American member of the Motorcycle Hall of Fame
- Jessica Springsteen (born 1991), American show jumping rider, daughter of Bruce Springsteen
- Pamela Springsteen (born 1962), American photographer and actress, sister of Bruce Springsteen
- Robert G. Springsteen (1904–1989), American film director
- "Springsteen" (song), a 2012 single by American country music artist Eric Church
- 23990 Springsteen, an asteroid.

== See also ==
- Springstein, Manitoba, a community in Canada
