= Illinois State Fairgrounds Racetrack =

Dirt track in Springfield, Illinois

The Springfield Mile
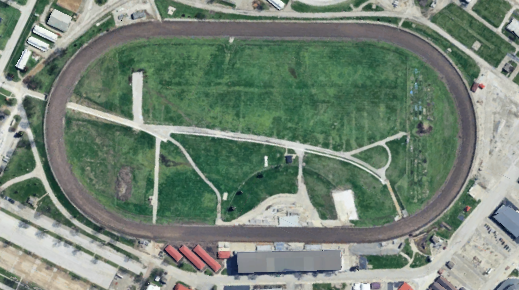
- Location: Springfield, Illinois
- Coordinates: 39.838°N 89.639°W
- Owner: State of Illinois
- Operator: Bob Sargent / Track Enterprises
- Opened: 1853; 173 years ago
- Major events: Current: ARCA Menards Series; Calypso 100 (1963–present); USAC Silver Crown Series; Bettenhausen 100 (1934–1940, 1947–2009, 2011–2015, 2017–2018, 2020–present); American Flat Track races (1937–1941, 1946–1966, 1982–2021, 2023–present)

Oval
- Surface: Clay
- Length: 0.99 mi (1.6 km)
- Turns: 4
- Illinois State Fairgrounds Racetrack
- U.S. Historic district – Contributing property
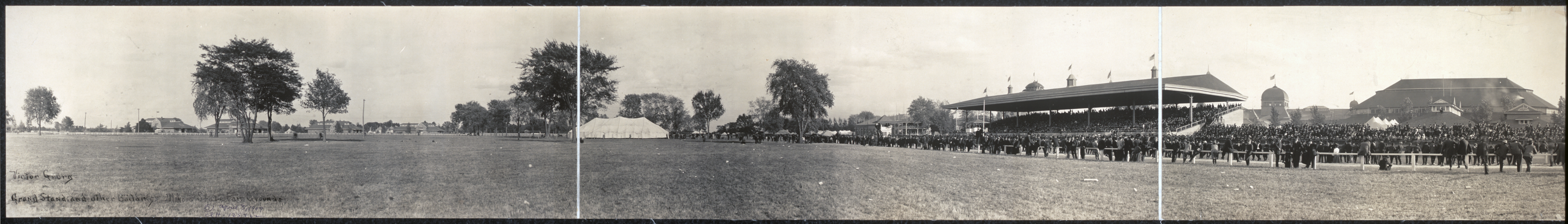
- Photo of the grandstands in 1909

- Location within Illinois Location within the United States
- Location: Jct. of Sangamon Ave. and Peoria Rd., Springfield, Illinois
- Part of: Illinois State Fairgrounds (ID90000720)
- MPS: Historic Fairgrounds in Illinois MPS
- Designated CP: May 14, 1990

The Illinois State Fairgrounds Racetrack is a one mile long clay oval motor racetrack on the Illinois State Fairgrounds in Springfield, the state capital. It is frequently nicknamed The Springfield Mile.

Constructed in the late 19th century and reconstructed in 1927, the track has hosted competitive auto racing since 1910, making it and one of the oldest speedways in the United States, and the oldest track to continually host national championship dirt track racing. It is the home of five world records for automobile racing, making it one of the fastest dirt tracks in the world. Since 1993, the venue is managed by Bob Sargent's Track Enterprises.

== History ==
The original mile track utilized the current frontstretch and the other side was behind the current grandstands and the straightaways were connected by tight turns.

The Illinois State Fair mile currently hosts the ARCA Menards Series' Springfield ARCA 100 stock car race, USAC Silver Crown dirt cars, UMP Late Models and Modifieds and the A.M.A. Grand National Championship. The only driver who has won races in three disciplines of racing in Ken Schrader who won in ARCA cars (1998), UMP Modifieds (1998), and midgets.

Billy Winn won the first AAA National Championship raced at the Illinois State Fairgrounds in 1934. A.J. Foyt ran his first national championship race there in August 1957. The track is host to two of the older memorial events in the United States, the Bettenhausen 100 for the USAC dirt championship cars, first run in 1961 and the Allen Crowe Memorial 100 stock car event for USAC, now ARCA, stock cars, first held in 1963. Both races are now held on the last weekend of the Illinois State Fair. Chuck Gurney is the only seven-time winner of the Bettenhausen 100, while ARCA driver Frank Kimmel won the Allen Crowe Memorial for the seventh time in 2008.

The Bettenhausen 100 was part of the AAA/USAC Championship Car schedule from 1934 to 1940, 1947 to 1970 and again in 1981 and 1982, and has been a Silver Crown race since then.

From 1946 to 1953, the A.M.A. Grand National Champion was crowned based solely on the results of the Springfield Mile held at the fairground racetrack. The 2020 Silver Crown race was delayed until October 18 by the COVID-19 pandemic; it was the latest that a race has been held at the track in a year and became the series' finale of the season. The 2022 Silver Crown race was also postponed to October, this time by rain.

== Race winners ==
=== ARCA Menards Series ===
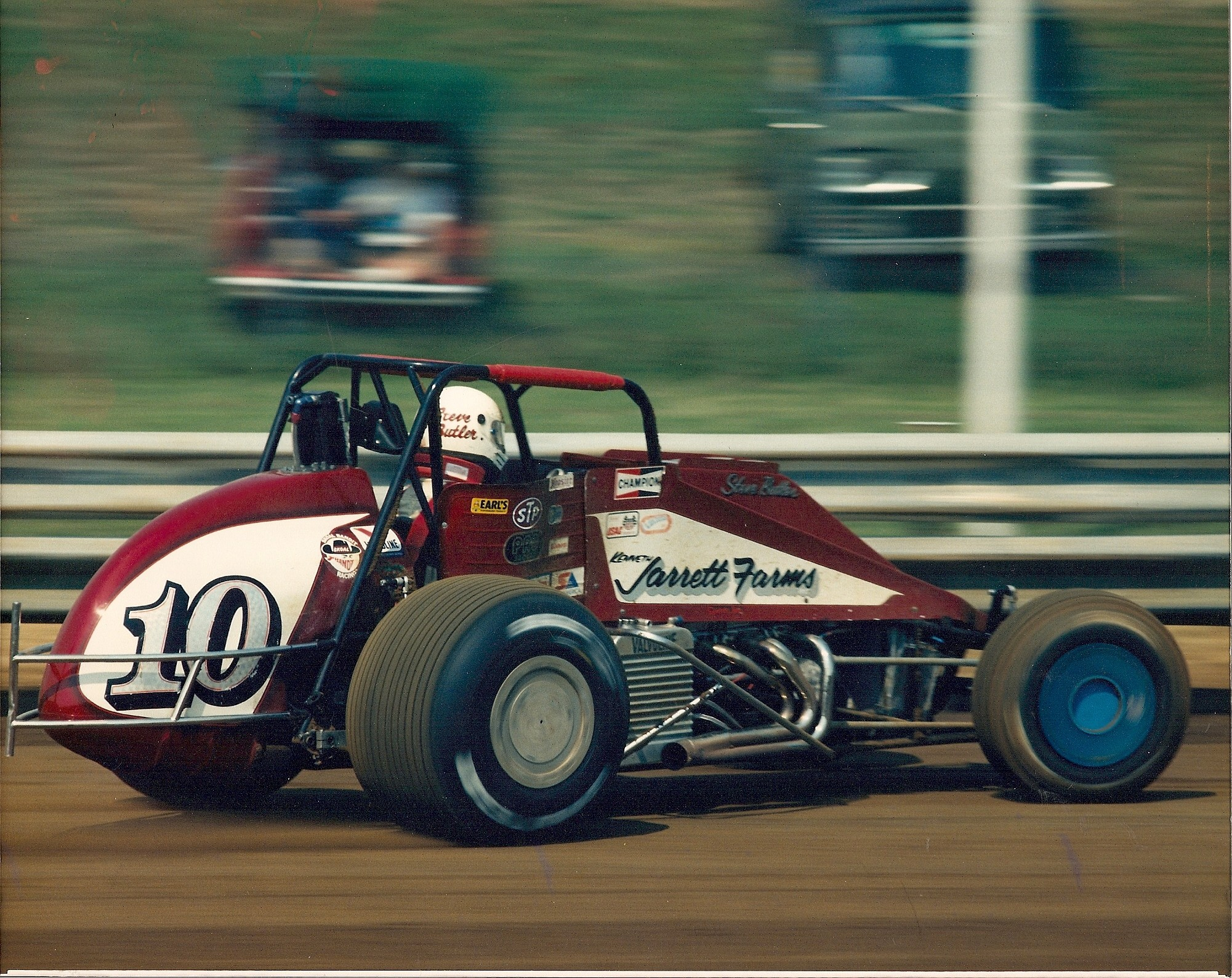
Steve Butler driving the Jarrett Farms Silver Crown car in 1988.

=== AAA/USAC Champ Car/Silver Crown race history ===
All winners were (United States) American

Season	Date	Winning driver	Team	Car	Ref
1934	August 25	Billy Winn	James Winn	Miller FD	
1935	August 24	Billy Winn	James Winn	Miller FD	
1936	August 22	Wilbur Shaw	Wilbur Shaw	Miller-Offy	
1937	August 21	Mauri Rose	Wilbur Shaw	Miller-Offy	
1938	August 20	Tony Willman	?	Cragar-Ford	
1939	August 19	John Crone	?	Miller	
1939	October 15	Emil Andres	Emil Andres	Adams-Offy	
1940	August 24	Rex Mays	Bowes Racing Team	Stevens-Winfield	
1941–1946	Not Held				
1947	September 28	Tony Bettenhausen	Belanger Motors	Stevens-Offy	
1948	August 21	Ted Horn	Ted Horn Enterprises	Horn-Offy	
1948	September 19	Myron Fohr	Carl Marchese	Marchese-Offy	
1949	August 20	Mel Hansen	Bowes Racing Team	Lesovsky-Offy	
1949	September 25	Johnnie Parsons	Kurtis Kraft Inc.	Kurtis Kraft-Offy	
1950	August 19	Paul Russo	Russo-Nichels	Russo-Nichels-Offy	
1950	October 1	Tony Bettenhausen	Belanger Motors	Kurtis Kraft-Offy	
1951	August 18	Tony Bettenhausen	Belanger Motors	Kurtis Kraft-Offy	
1952	August 16	Bill Schindler	Harry Allen Chapman	Russo-Nichels-Offy	
1953	June 21	Rodger Ward	M.A. Walker Electric	Kurtis Kraft-Offy	
1953	August 22	Sam Hanks	Bardahl/Ed Walsh	Kurtis Kraft-Offy	
1954	August 21	Jimmy Davies	Pat Clancy	Ewing-Offy	
1955	August 20	Jimmy Bryan	Dean Van Lines	Kuzma-Offy	
1956	August 19	Jimmy Bryan	Dean Van Lines	Kuzma-Offy	
1957	August 17	Rodger Ward	Roger Wolcott	Lesovsky-Offy	
1958	August 16	Johnny Thomson	Racing Associates, Inc.	Kuzma-Offy	
1959	August 22	Len Sutton	Central Excavating	Kuzma-Offy	
1960	August 20	Jim Packard	Stearly Motor Freight	Lesovsky-Offy	
1961	August 21	Jim Hurtubise	Barnett Brothers	Kuzma-Offy	
1962	August 19	Jim Hurtubise	Barnett Brothers	Kuzma-Offy	
1963	August 17	Rodger Ward	Leader Card Racers	Watson-Offy	
1964	August 22	A. J. Foyt	Ansted-Thompson Racing	Meskowski-Offy	
1965	August 21	A. J. Foyt	Ansted-Thompson Racing	Meskowski-Offy	
1966	August 20	Don Branson	Leader Card Racers	Watson-Offy	
1967	August 19	A. J. Foyt	Ansted-Thompson Racing	Meskowski-Offy	
1968	August 17	Roger McCluskey	Lindsey Hopkins Racing	Kuzma-Offy	
1969	August 18	Mario Andretti	STP Corporation	Kuzma-Offy	
1970	August 22	Al Unser	Vel's Parnelli Jones Racing	King-Ford	
1971	August 22	A. J. Foyt	Gilmore Racing	Meskowski-Foyt	
1972	August 20	Al Unser	Vel's Parnelli Jones Racing	King-Foyt	
1973	August 19	Mario Andretti	Vel's Parnelli Jones Racing	King-Foyt	
1974	August 18	Mario Andretti	Vel's Parnelli Jones Racing	King-Foyt	
1975	August 16	Al Unser	Vel's Parnelli Jones Racing	King-Foyt	
1976	August 21	Tom Bigelow	Leader Card Racers	Watson-Foyt	
1977	August 20	Larry Rice	David Lefrevre	Lefevre-Chevrolet	
1978	August 19	Gary Bettenhausen	Agajanian-King Racing	King-Chevrolet	
1979	August 18	Bobby Olivero	Leader Card Racers	Watson-Chevrolet	
1980	August 19	Pancho Carter	Emcee, Inc.	King-Chevrolet	
1981	August 15	George Snider	David Lefevre	Lefevre-Chevrolet	
1982	August 14	Bobby Olivero	Hodgdon-Curb Racing	Watson-Chevrolet	
1983	August 20	Gary Bettenhausen	Delrose-Holt Racing	King-Chevrolet	
1984	August 18	Chuck Gurney	Transportation Computer Systems	Watson-Chevrolet	
1985	August 17	Chuck Gurney	Transportation Computer Systems	Watson-Chevrolet	
1986	August 16	Jack Hewitt	Bob Hampshire Racing	Stanton-Chevrolet	
1987	August 22	Jack Hewitt	Bob Hampshire Racing	Stanton-Chevrolet	
1988	August 20	Steve Chassey	Delmar McClure	Adkins-Chevrolet	
1989	August 19	Chuck Gurney	Transportation Computer Systems	Watson-Chevrolet	
1990	August 18	Chuck Gurney	Transportation Computer Systems	Watson-Chevrolet	
1991	August 17	Chuck Gurney	Transportation Computer Systems	Watson-Chevrolet	
1992	August 22	Jimmy Sills	Bob Consani Racing	Beast-Chevrolet	
1993	August 21	Jack Hewitt	Team 6R Racing	Beast-Chevrolet	
1994	August 20	Chuck Gurney	Foxco Engineering	Beast-Chevrolet	
1995	August 19	Kenny Irwin	Calderwood Racing	Beast-Chevrolet	
1996	August 14	Chuck Gurney	Johnny Vance Racing	Beast-Chevrolet	
1997	August 16	Dave Darland	Foxco Engineering	Beast-Chevrolet	
1998	August 22	Russ Gamester	Russ Gamester	Beast-Chevrolet	
1999	August 21	Dave Darland	Foxco Engineering	Beast-Chevrolet	
2000	August 19	Jack Hewitt	Dewitt Motorsports	Beast-Chevrolet	
2001	August 18	Paul White	Paul Cook Racing	Beast-Chevrolet	
2002	August 17	J. J. Yeley	East-Stewart Racing	Beast-Ford	
2003	August 16	Dave Darland	Foxco Engineering	Beast-Chevrolet	
2004	August 21	Brian Tyler	Team 6R Racing	Beast-Chevrolet	
2005	August 21	Brian Tyler	Team 6R Racing	Beast-Mopar	
2006	August 19	Tracy Hines	Indiana Underground	Beast-Chevrolet	
2007	August 18	Ricky Stenhouse Jr.	Tony Stewart Racing	Eagle-Mopar	
2008	August 16	Brian Tyler	Team 6R Racing	Beast-Toyota	
2009	August 21	Cole Whitt	Keith Kunz Motorsports	Eagle-Chevrolet	
2010	Not Held				
2011	August 20	Brian Tyler	Team 6R Racing	Beast-Chevrolet	
2012	August 18	A. J. Fike	RFMS Racing	Beast-Chevrolet	
2013	August 17	A. J. Fike	RFMS Racing	Beast-Chevrolet	
2014	September 7	Kody Swanson	DePalma Motorsports	Maxim-Chevrolet	
2015	August 22	Kody Swanson	DePalma Motorsports	Maxim-Chevrolet	
2016	Not Held				
2017	August 19	Justin Grant	Carli-Hemelgarn Racing	DRC-Ford	
2018	August 18	Chris Windom	Nolen Racing	Beast-Chevrolet	
2019	Not Held				
2020	October 18	Kyle Larson	Sean Michael Motorsports		
2021	August 21	Kody Swanson	Chris Dyson Racing		
2022	October 15	Shane Cockrum			
2023	August 19	Logan Seavey			
2024	August 17	Justin Grant			
2025	August 16	Kody Swanson			
2026	August 22	Briggs Danner			

=== AMA Class C / Grand National / American Flat Track ===
Year	Rider
1937	Lester Hillbish
1938	Roul Castonguay
1939	Stanley Witinski
1940	Melvin Rhoades
1941	Wilfred Castonguay
1942-45	Not held
1946	Chet Dykgraaf
1947	Jimmy Chann
1948	Jimmy Chann
1949	Jimmy Chann
1950	Larry Headrick
1951	Bobby Hill
1952	Bobby Hill
1953	Bill Tuman
1954	Joe Leonard
1955	Everett Brashear
1956	Everett Brashear
1957	Joe Leonard
1958	Joe Leonard
1959	Carroll Resweber
1960	Troy Lee
1961	Carroll Resweber
1962	Bart Markel
1963	George Roeder
1964	Sammy Tanner
1965	Ralph White
1966	Gary Nixon
1967-81	Not held
1982	Ricky Graham
1983 (spring)	Ricky Graham
1983 (fall)	Ricky Graham
1984 (summer)	Ricky Graham
1984 (fall)	Ted Boody
1985 (spring)	Bubba Shobert
1985 (fall)	Ricky Graham
1986 (spring)	Ricky Graham
1986 (fall)	Bubba Shobert
1987 (spring)	Scott Parker
1987 (fall)	Bubba Shobert
1988 (spring)	Bubba Shobert
1988 (fall)	Scott Parker
1989 (July)	Scott Parker
1989 (fall)	Scott Parker
1990 (spring)	Scott Parker
1990 (fall)	Scott Parker
1991 (spring)	Ricky Graham
1991 (fall)	Scott Parker
1992 (spring)	Scott Parker
1992 (fall)	Scott Parker
1993 (spring)	Ricky Graham
1993 (fall)	Ricky Graham
1994	Scott Parker
1995 (spring)	Chris Carr
1995 (fall)	Scott Parker
1996 (fall)	Dave Camlin
1996 (fall)	Dave Camlin
1997 (fall)	Scott Parker
1997 (fall)	Kevin Atherton
1998 (spring)	Scott Parker
1998 (fall)	Chris Carr
1999 (spring)	Kevin Atherton
1999 (fall)	Rich King
2000 (spring)	Jay Springsteen
2000 (fall race 1)	Scott Parker
2001 (spring)	Chris Carr
2001 (fall)	Chris Carr
2002 (spring)	Chris Carr
2002 (fall)	Chris Carr
2003 (spring)	Rich King
2003 (fall)	Rich King
2004 (spring)	Rich King
2004 (fall)	Chris Carr
2005 (spring)	Rich King
2005 (fall)	Chris Carr
2006 (spring)	Chris Carr
2006 (fall)	Bryan Smith
2007 (spring)	Kenny Coolbeth
2007 (fall)	Chris Carr
2008 (race 1)	Kenny Coolbeth
2008 (race 2)	Chris Carr
2009 (spring)	Kenny Coolbeth
2009 (fall)	Jake Johnson
2010 (spring)	Jake Johnson
2010 (fall)	Bryan Smith
2011 (spring)	Jared Mees
2011 (fall)	Willie McCoy
2012 (spring)	Willie McCoy
2012 (fall)	Bryan Smith
2013 (race 1)	Brandon Robinson
2013 (race 2)	Brandon Robinson
2014 (spring)	Bryan Smith
2014 (fall)	Kenny Coolbeth
2015 (spring)	Bryan Smith
2015 (fall)	Bryan Smith
2016 (spring)	Bryan Smith
2016 (fall)	Kenny Coolbeth
2017 (spring)	Bryan Smith
2017 (fall)	Jared Mees
2018 (spring)	Jeffrey Carver Jr.
2018 (fall)	Bryan Smith
2019 (race 1)	Jared Mees
2019 (race 2)	Jared Mees
2020 (race 1)	Sammy Halbert
2020 (race 2)	Jared Mees
2021 (race 1)	Jared Mees
2021 (race 2)	Jared Mees
2022	Cancelled
2023 (race 1)	Jared Mees
2023 (race 2)	Briar Bauman
2024 (race 1)	Jared Mees
2024 (race 2)	Jared Mees
2025 (race 1)	Dallas Daniels
2025 (race 2)	Trent Lowe
2026 (race 1)	
2026 (race 2)	

== See also ==
- List of auto racing tracks in the United States
