= Nichole Cheza =

American motorcycle racer

Nichole Cheza Mees at the Sturgis TT August 6, 2017

Nichole Cheza (born June 11, 1987) is an American former professional dirt track motorcycle racer. She competed in the GNC1 class of the AMA Grand National Championship.

Cheza was born in Flint, Michigan and resides in Clio, Michigan. She started riding at the age of three and began racing at four. In 2003, Cheza won championships in both, dirt track racing and ice track racing. Cheza was the American Motorcyclist Association's Female Rider for the Year for 2003.

Cheza is married to professional motorcycle racer, Jared Mees.
