= Axell Hodges =

Motocross and X Games competitor

Personal information
- Born: August 20, 1996 (age 29) Encinitas, California, U.S.

Sport
- Sport: Freestyle Motocross
- Event: X Games
Medal record
Competition
Gold medal – first place	X-Games Summer 2021	MTX 110
Gold medal – first place	World of X-Games 2018	Real Moto
Gold medal – first place	X Games Minneapolis 2018	MTX QuarterPipe High Air
Silver medal – second place	X-Games Summer 2021	MTX QuarterPipe High Air
Silver medal – second place	X-Games Norway 2019	MTX QuarterPipe High Air
Silver medal – second place	World of X-Games 2017	Real Moto
Silver medal – second place	X-Games Austin 2016	MTX Best Whip
Bronze medal – third place	X-Games Minneapolis 2018	MTX Best Whip
Bronze medal – third place	X-Games Sydney 2017	MTX Best Whip

Axell "Slay" Hodges (born August 20, 1996) is an X Games and motocross competitor. In July 2019, Hodges was supposed to participate in History's "Evel Live 2", but a few days before the live performance, he sustained serious injuries in a crash during a practice jump in which he was attempting to beat a record set by Robbie Maddison in 2011 of jumping 378 feet and 9 inches on a motorcycle.

== Competition history ==
In 2012 Hodges won the C Class Loretta Lynn's Amateur Championship, known as the world's largest amateur motocross race.

Hodges received gold in the Moto X Quarterpipe High Air and gold in Moto X Best Whip at X Games Minneapolis 2018. He has received a total of seven X Games medals.

== Media ==
Hodges commands a large social media following. He was a guest on the MTV show Ridiculousness.
