= Bobby Hill (motorcyclist) =

American motorcycle racer (1922–2022)

Allen Robert Hill (July 8, 1922 — July 12, 2022) was an American motorcycle racer. He won the A.M.A. Grand National Championship in 1951 and 1952 by virtue of his victories on the Springfield Mile. Hill won a total of 12 AMA nationals during his professional racing career spanning the years 1947 to 1959. He was inducted to the AMA Motorcycle Hall of Fame in 1998.

== Racing career ==
Born in Triadelphia, West Virginia, Hill started riding motorcycles when he was 16. He started racing in 1940. Due to the outbreak of World War II, his racing career was put on hold. Hill served in the United States Marine Corps. After the war, Hill raced in the 1947 Daytona 200 which he was leading for some time.

During the 1947 season, Hill moved to Grove City, Ohio to be closer to the racing action. After coming so close to winning his very first national, Hill won his first race in Atlanta on Aug. 8, 1948, and even then he had to share the victory. In one of the most memorable races ever, Hill and Billy Huber crossed the line in a dead heat and both were declared winner, the only time that has happened in AMA racing history.

After winning the national title in 1951 and 1952, Hill earned a victory in the Daytona 200 in 1954 riding a BSA.

== Personal life ==
Hill died on July 12, 2022, at the age of 100.
