= Scott Parker (motorcyclist) =

American motorcycle racer

Scott Parker (born November 21, 1961, in Flint, Michigan) is an American professional motorcycle dirt track racer.

== Racing career ==
Parker is a nine-time winner of the A.M.A. Grand National Championship. He holds the all-time Grand National Dirt Track Championship record of 94 race wins and is a three-time winner of the AMA Pro Athlete of the Year Award.

Parker was inducted into the Motorsports Hall of Fame of America in 2009.
