= Kawasaki Ninja 400R =

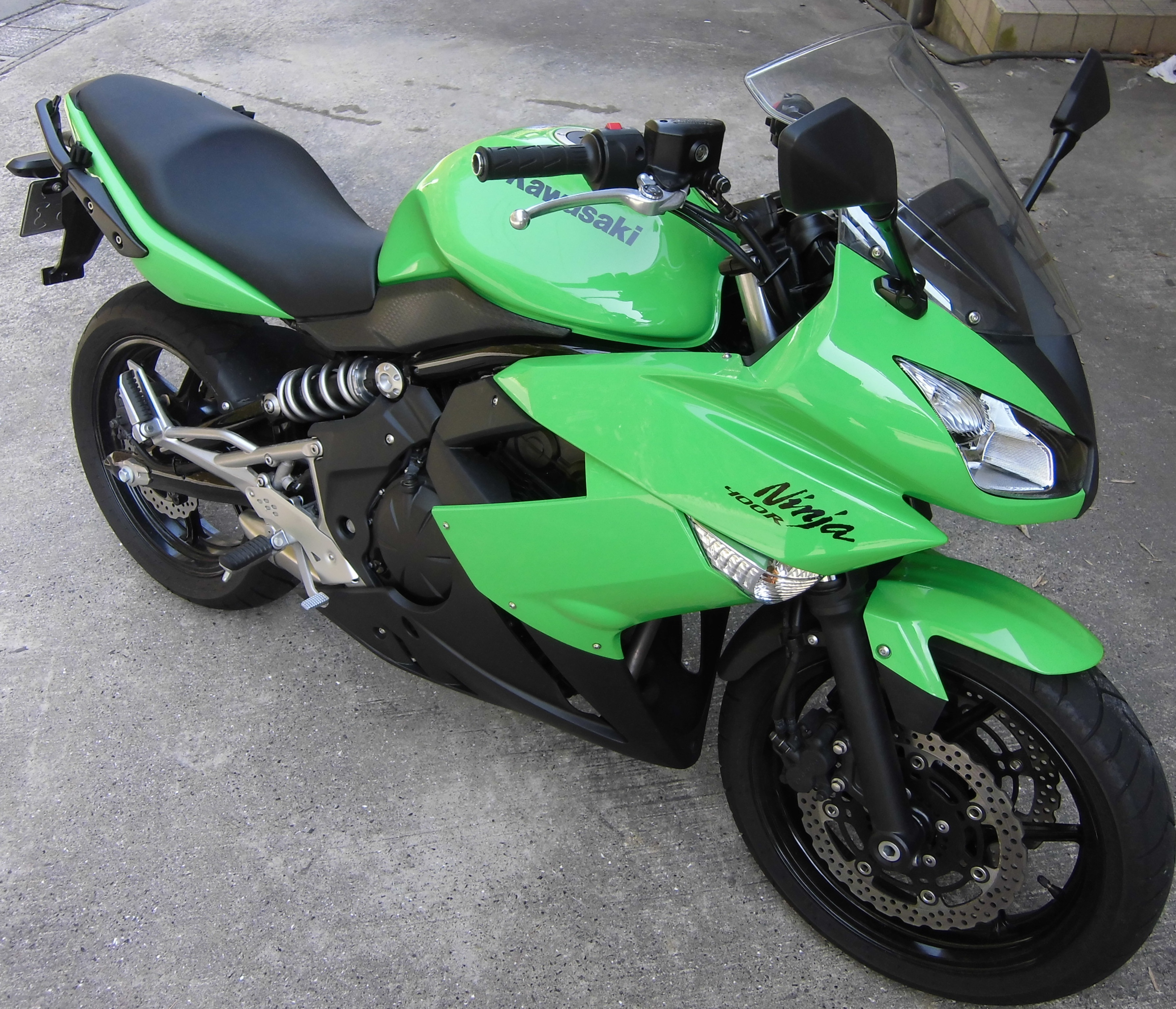
- Manufacturer: Kawasaki Motorcycle & Engine Company
- Also called: Kawasaki ER-4f
- Parent company: Kawasaki Heavy Industries
- Production: 2011–2017
- Successor: Kawasaki Ninja 400
- Class: Standard
- Engine: 399 cc (24.3 cu in) DOHC 8 valves, liquid cooled parallel twin
- Bore / stroke: 68.4 mm × 54.3 mm (2.69 in × 2.14 in)
- Compression ratio: 11:1
- Power: 32 kW (43 hp) @ 9,500 rpm (claimed)
- Torque: 37 N⋅m (27 lbf⋅ft) 7,500 rpm (claimed)
- Ignition type: CDI
- Transmission: 6-speed, wet clutch, chain drive
- Frame type: Diamond steel trellis
- Suspension: Front: 41 mm (1.6 in) telescopic fork, 120 mm (4.7 in) travel Rear: Single shock, adjustable preload, swingarm, 125 mm (4.9 in) travel
- Brakes: Front: 2 x dual piston 300 mm (12 in) petal discs Rear 220 mm (8.7 in) petal disc
- Tires: Front: 120/70ZR17M/C (58W); Rear: 160/60ZR17M/C (69W)
- Rake, trail: 25˚, 106 mm (4.2 in)
- Wheelbase: 1,410 mm (56 in)
- Dimensions: L: 2,100 mm (83 in); W: 760 mm (30 in); H: 1,200 mm (47 in)
- Seat height: 790 mm (31 in)
- Weight: 203 kg (448 lb) (claimed) (wet)
- Fuel capacity: 15.5 L (3.4 imp gal; 4.1 US gal)
- Related: Kawasaki Ninja 250R; Kawasaki Ninja 500R; Kawasaki Ninja 650R; Kawasaki ER-4n (JDM only)

The Kawasaki Ninja 400R is a motorcycle in the Ninja series from the Japanese manufacturer Kawasaki. It was announced for the 2011 model year, and is sold in Canada and New Zealand.

No plans currently exist to bring the bike to the UK market. Instead, a new Ninja 400 (2018) is introduced for the global market. While the new Ninja 400 is similar in many ways, it is mostly a different bike. The Ninja 400R is based on the Ninja 650R. There is also a naked version of the 400R called the ER-4n introduced in 2011 only sold in Japan.

== See also ==
- Kawasaki Ninja series
