= Bryan Smith (motorcyclist) =

American motorcycle racer

- Smith at Calistoga Half-Mile, 2017
- Born: June 24, 1983 (age 43); Flint, Michigan, U.S.
- Current team: Factory Harley-Davidson
- Bike number: 4

Bryan Smith (born June 24, 1983) is an American professional motorcycle racer from Flint, Michigan.

== Career ==
Bryan Smith at the Sturgis TT 2017.

Smith has been racing for over fourteen years. In 2015, Smith competed in his first X Games, winning gold in the Flat-Track event. Smith has won five races at the Illinois State Fairgrounds Racetrack, the latest being the AMA Pro Flat Track Grand National Championship.

Smith's areer began when he raced in BMX at age six, which was followed moved to Flat Track and Ice Racing at the age of seven.

2014 Smith looked to have the GNC1 championship in his grasp until a smoking bike led to a black flag at Calistoga. Smith didn't bring the bike into the pits and was later disqualified, forfeiting the points from a second place showing and putting himself just too far behind eventual champion Jared Mees. Smith's remarkable season included a series-best five victories, including Kawasaki's first ever Half-Mile win. Outside of the disqualification, Smith was in the top-ten in every race except for the opener at Daytona.

2013 Smith excelled on mile-long courses, winning two races on his way to earning the coveted GNC Expert Twins Championship.

2012 Two wins and 12 top-ten finishes helped Smith win the GNC Expert Twins Championship. Finished fourth in the overall standings and locked in 11 top-fives. His two wins came at the Cal Expo and the Illinois State Fairgrounds. Both victories came on mile-long tracks.

2011 Smith won the California Expo Fair GNC Twins event. He also earned two top-tens and six top-fives. Raced with Fasthog.com Harley-Davidson/Honda.

2010 Smith had an impressive season, winning the Indianapolis Mile in front of the MotoGP crowd on board his Ninja 650 Kawasaki, and following it up with a win at the Springfield Mile September 5. Raced with Monster Energy/Kawasaki/Werner-Springsteen Racing team.

2009 Smith won the AMA Pro Grand National Twins race at Lima, podiumed twice at Indianapolis and Grove City, and had a total of six top-five finishes. Raced with Moroneys Screamin Eagle Harley-Davidson race team.

2008 Finished second in twins points, with one win at the Beulah Mile in Ohio. Also earned one podium in the singles at the Daytona Short Track.

2007 Finished third in the twins points, had one win in the single division at the Castle Rock ST.

2006 Won two GNC events - the opening round at the Daytona Short Track and the fall Springfield Mile, finishing the year third in the twins points.

2005 Joined the Moroney's H-D team and earned a few podiums.

== Sacramento Mile ==
Smith won the Sacramento Mile a record seven times in a row, from 2011 to 2017.

== X Games Harley-Davidson Flat-Track ==
Smith won a gold medal in the 2015 X Games Harley-Davidson Flat-Track.

== Superprestigio of the Americas ==
Smith placed fourth in the Flat Track Final and 8th in the Superprestigio Final at the inaugural Superprestigio of the Americas on November 21, 2015.
