= Harley-Davidson XG750R =

XG750R

The Harley-Davidson XG750R is a competition-only motorcycle made by Harley-Davidson for flat track racing. It is powered by the fuel-injected, liquid-cooled Revolution X V-twin engine from the 2015 Harley-Davidson Street 750. It is the first all-new flat track racing motorcycle from Harley-Davidson in 44 years.

== Competition ==
It was first used in competition by Davis Fisher of the Harley-Davidson Screamin' Eagle Factory Team on April 9, 2016, in the GNC1 race at the AMA Pro Flat Track Circuit of the Americas Half-Mile. The motorcycle was built by Vance & Hines, long known in motorcycle racing for their road racing and drag racing success.

== Differences between the XR750 and XG750 ==
The XG has a number of changes from the older XR750, reflecting newer technology.

XR750 and XG750R differences
Attribute	XR750	XG750R
Engine layout	45-degree V-twin	60-degree V-twin
Cooling	Air	Liquid
Fuel delivery	Carburetion	Injection
Valves per cylinder	2	4
Valve actuation	Pushrod	Single overhead camshaft
Crankshaft bearings	Roller	Plain
Connecting Rods	Fork and Blade	Conventional
Rev Limiter	No	Yes
