= Jay Springsteen =

American motorcycle racer

Jay Springsteen (born April 15, 1957 in Flint, Michigan) is an American former professional motorcycle dirt track racer.

Springsteen began his professional racing career in 1975 by winning the American Motorcyclist Association (AMA) Rookie of the Year award. As a member of the Harley-Davidson factory race team, he went on to win three consecutive A.M.A. Grand National Championships in 1976, 1977, and 1978. He accumulated 43 Grand National Championship dirt track victories during a career that spanned almost 30 years.

According to the Motorcycle Hall of Fame induction, Springsteen earned enough race winnings to live on by age 17 and by age 18, he was signed by the Harley-Davidson team. He finished fifth in the 1986 Daytona 200.

== Race record ==
Springsteen has a notable race record: four decades as a leading rider, with victories spanning 25 years; three championships in a row; 43 national wins including every type of dirt track—miles, half-miles, short track and TTs. He was ranked in the top-ten national riders 23 times.

Referring to Springsteen's "mysterious illness" that caused sudden and debilitating abdominal pain when he was due to race, forcing him to miss many races, Dave Despain asked "one of the great 'what if' questions in dirt track history ... If Springer had stayed healthy, how many would he have won?"

== Awards and recognition ==
In 1994, a panel of 30 motorcycle racing experts convened by American Motorcyclist selected Springsteen as the best dirt-track rider of all time.

Springsteen was inducted into the AMA Motorcycle Hall of Fame in 2003, and to the Motorsports Hall of Fame of America in 2005.

Harley-Davidson's racing manager Dick O'Brien called Springsteen "one of the all-time greats and maybe the best ever."
