= ATK Motorcycles =

ATK
- Type: Various
- Industry: Motorsport
- Founded: 1985; 41 years ago
- Founder: Horst Leitner
- Headquarters: Centerville, Utah, U.S.
- Products: Motorcycles; All-terrain vehicle
- Website: http://atkusa.com/

ATK is an American motorcycle and all-terrain vehicle company founded in 1985 and located in Centerville, Utah, USA. As of 2016, it has been operating primarily to support previously sold models through parts and service manual distribution. While ATK was initially founded on in-house chassis designs and modified sourced engines, the brand has primarily focused on acquisition and badge-engineered models from multiple companies worldwide since 2004.

== History ==
=== Foundation ===
1985 ATK 604
- Manufacturer: ATK Leitner Corp
- Production: 1985 - 1993
- Assembly: Laguna Beach, California
- Predecessor: ATK 560
- Successor: ATK 605
- Class: Motocross
- Engine: Rotax 562 cc (34.3 cu in) air cooled four-valve four-stroke single
- Bore / stroke: 94mmx81mm
- Compression ratio: 9.4:1
- Top speed: <70 Mph
- Power: 44.1hp@8000rpm
- Torque: 34.0@6500rpm
- Ignition type: CDI
- Transmission: Manual wet-clutch 5-speed Chain Final Drive
- Frame type: 4130 Chrome Moly
- Suspension: Front: Inverted Forks w/11.8” Travel; Rear: White Power Monoshock w/12.6" Travel
- Brakes: Front: Hydraulic Disc; Rear: Drum
- Tires: 3.00x21 Front; 4.50x19 Rear
- Wheelbase: 58 in.
- Seat height: 37.5 in.
- Weight: 252lbs (dry); 271lbs (full tank) (wet)
- Fuel capacity: 2.8 gal
- Related: $4295 MSRP
- Footnotes / references Information provided via: 1989 ATK Brochure; Dirt Rider Magazine Oct 1985

ATK was founded by Horst Leitner, an Austrian-born engineer, Grand Prix motocross racer, and International Six Days Trial gold medallist, following his relocation to the United States in 1980. In 1985, after successfully patenting a new motorcycle drive-tensioning system and marketing custom-frame kit bikes designed to accept Honda XR350 engines, Leitner was approached by Puch, who offered to fund a motorcycle company based on his designs. Leitner named the new venture ATK after his patented device to eliminate chain torque for improved handling. Known later as the A-Trak, Leitner originally called this device the Anti-Tension Kettenantrieb (German: Anti-Tension Chain Drive). His first prototype machine would produce the following placements:

- Overall win at the 1985 Four-Stroke Nationals, ridden by Brian Myerscough
- Semi-win at ABC's 1985 Superbikes Event, ridden by Steve Eklund
- 2nd in Semi at 13th overall at Ascot TT Nationals, ridden by Warren Reid
- Pro Open Class win at the 1986 Four-Stroke Championships, ridden by Doug Dubach
- Placement at the 1986 CNC Four-Stroke Nationals; Ridden by Cycle World Staff riders

By 1987, due to the high regard for ATK's chassis, which already utilized a Rotax engine, Can-Am approached ATK about creating a replacement for their off-road line using dated 250 cc and 400 cc two-stroke Rotax engines. From this foundation, ATK created the 250 and 406 models. These motorcycles retained many of ATK's unique chassis features, including a countershaft-mounted rear disc brake, side-mounted single rear shock with no linkage, offset fuel tank filler, air filter beneath the gas tank, and backward-facing brake pedal.

As the prototypes were delivered, Can-Am cancelled the deal and announced their withdrawal from the off-road motorcycle market. This led to an agreement between Leitner and North American Can-Am dealers to fund the production of the 406 and future motorcycles. ATK gained a nationwide dealer network and funding, and Can-Am dealers retained a product to sell. From 1989 until 1995, ATK was the fifth largest off-road motorcycle manufacturer in North America. An article by Motocross Action magazine in December 2019 states that ATK produced thousands of four-stroke motorcycles since 1985, predating Japanese manufacturers' move to four-stroke engines by over a decade.

==== Models ====
ATK initially released the 560, based on the displacement of its 562 cc (34.3 cu in) Rotax four-stroke engine. Modifications to the frame would see the designation change to the 604, which was used until the motorcycle received an engine revision in 1994. In 1988, ATK released the 406, the two-stroke air-cooled Rotax-powered model that would become synonymous with their two-stroke line. The two-stroke line was also the first to receive a second bike, a 250 cc (15 cu in) counterpart.

In 1991, Leitner sold ATK to an investment company, who would move the corporation to Utah. The new owners would expand the product line-up greatly, offering a second four-stroke, the 350, as well as electric-start and lightened variations of most models. The company also released ATK's first ATV, based on the 604, and XR kits, a full set of ATK accoutrements that accepted a Honda XR350 engine.

1994 would see the 604 revised into the 605, as well as the introduction of the 600 Flat Track model. 1996 brought the liquid-cooled 250 and 260 lines, as well as a Limited Edition 406 send-off model as ATK retired their open-class two-stroke offering. 1999 would see the introduction of the 50MX, an introductory and 125 2 stroke. motocross/pit bike model sold for two years. In 2003, with the purchase of Cannondale Motorsports, ATK began to assimilate the acquired models into their line-up. Thus began a new era for the company, as it began to badge-engineer its products.

125	604	604 Electric Start	604 Cross Country	350	350 Electric Start	350 Cross Country	406	406 Cross Country	250	250 Cross Country	ATK Quad	Special Models
1985	X											
1986	X											
1987	X											
1988	X						X		X			
1989		X					X		X			
1990	X		X				X		X			
1991	X	X	X	X	X	X	X	X	X	X	X	XR Kit
1992	X	X	X	X	X	X	X	X	X	X	X	XR Kit
1993	X	X	X	X	X	X	X	X	X	X	X	XR Kit
1994				X		X	X	X	X	X		
Information provided Via ATK advertising and service manuals; see references

	605	605 Dual Sport	605 Cross Country	350	350 Dual Sport	350 Cross Country	406	406 Cross Country	250 Cross Country	250 Liquid Cooled	260 Liquid Cooled	Special Models
1994	X	X	X					X	X			
1995		X	X		X	X		X	X			
1996		X	X							X	X	406 Limited; Edition
1997	X	X	X		X	X				X	X	
1998		X	X		X	X				X	X	605 Law Enforement
Information provided Via ATK advertising and service manuals; see references

	605 Cross Country	605 Dual Sport	490 Cross Country	490 Dual Sport	350 Cross Country	350 Dual Sport	500 Flat Tracker	600 Flat Tracker	250 Liquid Cooled	260 Liquid Cooled	50cc MX	Special Models
1998								X				
1999	X	X	X	X	X	X	X	X	X	X	X	
2000	X	X	X	X	X	X	X	X	X	X	X	
2001		X						X	X	X		
2002		X						X	X	X		
Information provided Via ATK advertising and service manuals; see references

=== Cannondale acquisition ===
2003 ATK-Cannondale X440
- Manufacturer: Cannondale Motorsports
- Production: 2001 - 2003
- Assembly: Bedford, Pennsylvania U.S.
- Predecessor: Cannondale X400
- Successor: ATK 440
- Class: Motorcycle
- Engine: Cannondale 432 cc (26.4 cu in) Liquid cooled 4-valve four-stroke single
- Bore / stroke: 3.74in × 2.4in
- Compression ratio: 12.5:1
- Top speed: Unknown
- Power: Unknown
- Torque: Unknown
- Ignition type: CDI
- Transmission: Manual wet-clutch 5-speed Chain Final Drive
- Frame type: Aluminum
- Suspension: Front: Telescopic Forks; Rear: Single shock
- Brakes: Front: Hydraulic single disc Rear: Hydraulic Single disc
- Tires: 80/100 R21; Rear:110/100 R19
- Wheelbase: Unknown
- Seat height: Unknown
- Weight: 260lbs (dry)
- Fuel capacity: Unknown
- Related: $7999 MSRP
- Footnotes / references Information provided via

The acquisition of Cannondale Motorsports by ATK was the result of a failed $80-million dollar+ investment between Cannondale Bicycle Corporation and private equity firms in the late 1990s to create a subsidiary producing off-road motorcycles and ATV vehicles. First announced at the 1998 Cincinnati Motorcycle Dealer Show (at which Cannondale began accepting dealer orders), their X400 Motocross bike would not appear on showroom floors until 2001. The delays in delivery were the result of several engineering issues related to the many advancements Cannondale attempted to incorporate into the motorcycle, including two engine redesigns. The potential of the new machine was found so impressive by Dirt Bike Magazine, they named it Bike of the Year, two years ahead of its release. In February 1999, Dirt Bike editor Ron Lawson was quoted regarding the unreleased bike's possible appeal to "older moto guys who want kind of a status symbol" as opposed to novice motorcyclists.

Approaching release, several publications were provided with test machines. Many noted unreliability but focused on the advanced features, such as a reversed-placement engine, aluminum frame, electric start, unique air intake, and electronic fuel injection. Only one publication gave the machine a scathing review, a foreshadowing of public reception. Once the machine was released, word of mouth and consistent recalls tanked sales. Confidence wavered, and outside investors called against Cannondale. While Cannondale attempted to correct various issues with the 2002 X440 model, it was "too little, too late", as one publication noted in 2013. In January 2003, Cannondale Motorsports filed bankruptcy and ATK Motorcycles acquired all remaining inventory.

While the initial Cannondale motorcycle was considered a failure (and often appears on lists of the worst off-road motorcycles ever produced), the Cannondale FX400 ATV was more positively received due to its chassis. As ATK took over sales and production of Cannondale products, the ATV required marginal attention and was re-released to the market. ATK turned their focus to the X440, continuing to improve on the 2002 model. Resolving fuel delivery issues, suspension geometry, and reliability, the machine was placed back on the market. After another brief hiatus, additional refinement and a slight displacement increase, it was rebranded as the ATK 450 and offered in various trims. These models, including the street-legal factory SuperMoto set-up, sold modestly through 2008.

For 2003, ATK continued to offer variations of the 50MX, as well as a two-stroke 125, the 250 and 260 Enduros, the four-stroke 605 and 500 Enduro, and a 600 Police Edition. The biggest news, however, was the release of the ATK 700, marketed as the Intimidator. This rebadged 78 hp (58 kW) motocross bike with a 700 cc (43 cu in) two-stroke engine was available in limited quantities. Along with its Maico counterpart, it ranks among the fastest off-road motorcycles ever released. The ATK/Maico bike was offered intermittently until 2008, and solidified the reputation of badge engineering, partly earned by its acquisition of Cannondale.

ATK would continue to sell their 450 MX bikes and ATVs in various trim through 2008. While always marketed under the ATK banner, ATVs continued to use Cannondale graphics, and at times used the "ATK C-Dales" moniker for marketing.

=== Hyosung collaboration ===
2014 ATK-Hyosung ST7
- Manufacturer: Hyosung Corp
- Production: 2011 - 2014
- Assembly: Changwon, South Korea
- Predecessor: ATK-Hyosung GV650
- Successor: Hyosung ST7
- Class: Motorcycle
- Engine: Hyosung 678.2 cc (41.39 cu in) Liquid cooled 8-valve four-stroke 90° V-twin engine
- Bore / stroke: 81.5 x 65mm
- Compression ratio: 11.5:1
- Power: 46.0kW / @8000RPM
- Torque: 57.3Nm / @7000RPM
- Ignition type: CDI
- Transmission: Manual wet-clutch 5-speed Belt Final Drive
- Frame type: Steel
- Suspension: Front: Telescopic Forks; Rear: Hydraulic Double shock
- Brakes: Front: Hydraulic single disc, 4 pistons caliper Rear: Hydraulic Single disc, 2 pistons caliper
- Tires: 120/80-16 Front; 170/80-15 Rear
- Wheelbase: 66.5 in.
- Dimensions: L: 97.2 in. W: 37.8 in. H: 44.6 in.
- Seat height: 26.5 in.
- Weight: 538lbs (dry)
- Fuel capacity: 4.5 gal
- Related: $7299 MSRP
- Footnotes / references Information provided via: Total Motorcycles 2014 ST7 Review

In November 2009, it was announced that ATK and Hyosung would be collaborating on a line of small motorcycles to be distributed through select Harley-Davidson dealerships. While Harley-Davidson did not endorse the distribution, they did not actively prevent it until later, as Hyosung bikes were pulled from most dealerships prior to the introduction of Harley's competing small motorcycles in 2015.

In May 2011, ATK began delivering the first of three Hyosung models with ATK nameplates and a few requested changes. The market would see the distribution of the GV250, GV650 and ST7 models, each featuring the respective 250 cc (15 cu in), 650 cc (40 cu in), and 700 cc (43 cu in) V-twin engines, until S&T sold ownership of Hyosung to Kolao Holdings in 2014.

== Controversies ==
=== 1989 print advertisement ===
In 1989, ATK approved a national print advertisement campaign depicting four men of Asian descent observing an ATK motorcycle, with the tag line "To us, the Japanese all look alike". While text within the ad clarifies this is in reference to the similarities of Japanese motocross machines against the unique features of ATK's offerings, the ad has appeared in commentaries regarding racism in advertising.

=== Cannondale X400 MXA review ===
In November 2000, Motocross Action (MXA) published a negative review of the 2001 Cannondale X400 motorcycle. While staff writers acknowledged its potential, criticisms such as soft shocks, a "weird" setup, consistent starter failure, the power band, maintenance, and safety issues (including the bike's movement without throttle input) were more candid than most publications of the day. This led Cannondale officers to report back to investors that this review was the reason sales of the X400 were below expectation. In 2018, test rider Jody Weisel responded to the controversy in an article titled "The Worst Bikes I've ever Raced";

When people accuse me of being unfair to a bike in an MXA test, claiming that I am the reason that the bike failed in the public arena, I always say the same thing: “I don’t make ’em, I just break ’em.” Which leads me to my 2001 Cannondale MX400 experience. I knew this bike was a roach before it was even made.

== See also ==
- All-terrain vehicle
- Harley-Davidson Street
- Types of motorcycles § Off-road
