= Kenny Coolbeth =

American motorcycle racer

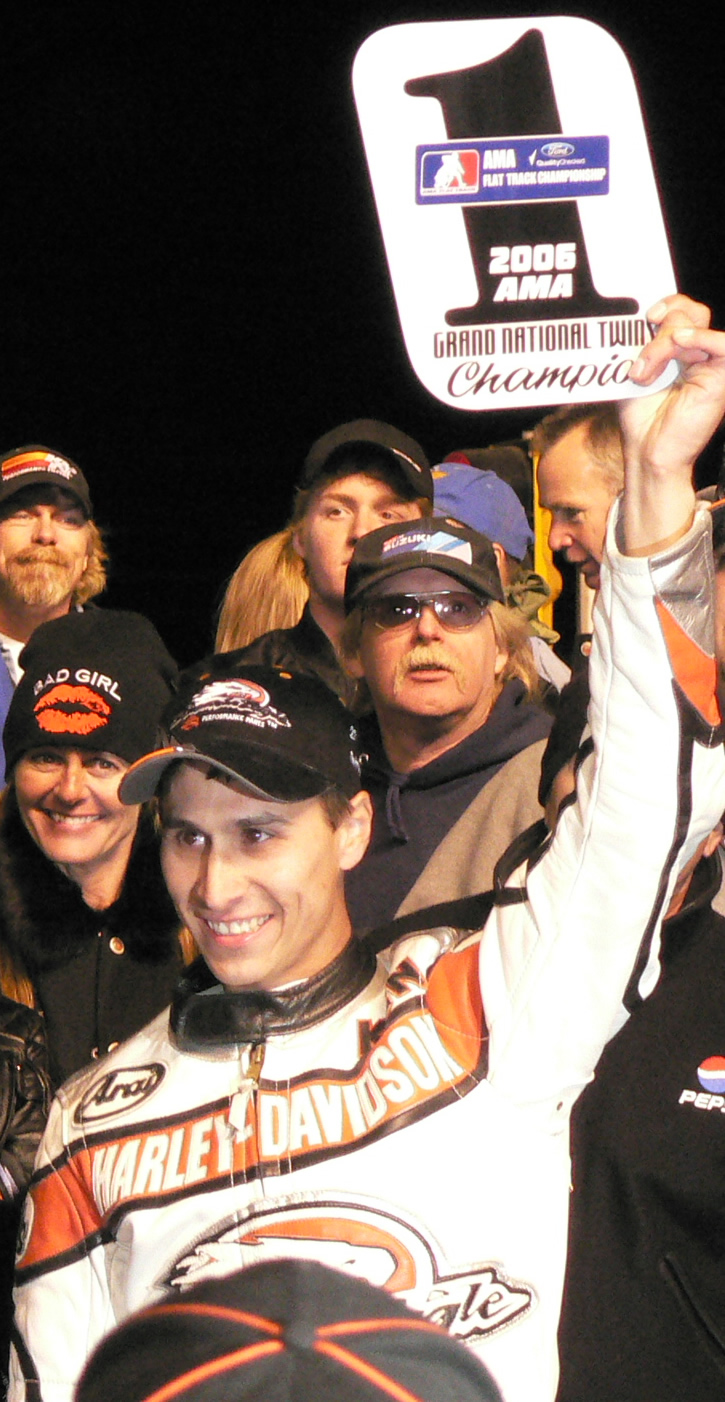
Coolbeth holding the 2006 U.S. National Flattrack championship trophy

Kenny Coolbeth Jr. (born March 30, 1977) is a flat track motorcycle racer from Warren Connecticut, United States. He won the 2006, 2007, and 2008 AMA Grand National Championship. He races the #2 Indian motorcycle. He attended Wamogo Regional High School.

== Career ==
Coolbeth began his national career as the AMA Flat Track Rookie of the year in 1994.

Coolbeth won the 1997 AMA 600cc National Hotshoe title. He repeated as the 1998 AMA 600cc National Hotshoe champion.

Coolbeth's 2001 season was his first in the top-five in the final points in the Grand National Flat Track championship. He had six podium (top-three) finishes in the season, and finished fourth in the final points standings. He had five wins in the Supertracker series, and finished second in the season standing for the series.

Coolbeth raced for the Corbin Harley-Davidson team in 2002. He won the Columbus, Ohio race, and had five more podium finishes. He finished in third in series points.

Coolbeth raced for the KTM Sport USA team in 2003. His two wins that season were at Sedalia, Missouri and Vernon, New York. His fourth-place finish in the points was his third consecutive Top 5 season. He also won the AMA National Hot Shoe 505 Expert and the 750/1000 Expert races at DeLeon Springs, Florida.

Coolbeth had nine podium finishes in 2004, including a win at Davenport, Iowa. He finished third in the final points standings. He also won the AMA National Hot Shoe 750/1000 race at Savannah, Georgia. He raced for the Jones Powersport team.

Coolbeth finished second for the 2005 season title. He won the races at Lake Odessa, Michigan and Farley, Iowa, plus had four additional podium finishes. He won two AMA Nat'l Hot Shoe 505 Expert races. He raced for the KTM/Mid-America Harley-Davidson team.

Coolbeth was AMA Grand National Twins Champion in 2006, 2007, and 2008. He also won the Singles Championship in 2007.

Kenny Coolbeth, Calistoga Half-Mile, July 29, 2017

In 2015, Coolbeth competed in the inaugural X Games Harley-Davidson Flat-Track, placing ninth in the Flat-Track Final. He also raced in the inaugural Superprestigio of the Americas placing third in the Flat Track Final and the Superprestigio of the Americas Final.
