= GNC1 =

GNC1 was the premier class in the 2015-16 AMA Grand National Championship for professional motorcycle flat track racing in the United States.

The GNC1 class debuted in the 2015 season, replacing the previous Expert division and combining both singles and twins events in a unified championship.

In GNC1, twin-cylinder motorcycles were the primary machines and were used for Mile and Half-Mile circuits while single-cylinder motorcycles were used for Short Track and TT events. Since 2017 the GNC1 class has been replaced by the new AFT Twins class, featuring twin-cylinder motorcycles at all events.

== GNC1 Twins ==
=== Eligible engines ===
As of May 20, 2016

- Aprilia
  - RSV 1000 R
  - RXV 550 / SXV 550
- BMW F800
- Buell Motorcycle Company
  - XB9
  - XB12
  - XB3
- Ducati
  - Desmodue 803
  - Desmodue Evo 1100
  - Desmoquattro 748
  - Testastretta 749, 821, 848, 939
- Harley-Davidson
  - XR-750 (race-only engine)
  - XG750
  - 883
  - XR1200
- Honda
  - NC700X
  - RS750 (race-only engine)
- Indian
  - Scout FTR750 (race-only engine)
  - Scout 60
- Kawasaki
  - Ninja 650R
- KTM
  - LC8
- Suzuki
  - SV650
  - SV1000
  - TL1000
- Triumph
  - Bonneville 865 (air-cooled)
  - Bonneville 900 (liquid-cooled)
- Yamaha
  - TDM
  - FZ-07

=== Engine displacement ===
550-1250cc with the following restrictions: racing-only engines (Harley-Davidson XR750, Honda RS750, and Indian Motorcycle Race 750) may not exceed 750cc, engines greater than 1000cc are restricted to air/oil cooled.

=== Minimum weight ===
300 pounds (136 kg) including fuel.

=== Tires ===
Dunlop DT3 19-inch flat track tires.

=== Fuel ===
Sunoco Supreme 112

== GNC1 Singles ==
=== Eligible motorcycles ===
- Honda CRF450R
- Husqvarna FC450
- Kawasaki KX450F
- KTM 450 SX-F
- KTM 450 XC
- Suzuki RM-Z 450
- Yamaha YZ450F
- Zaeta 450DT

=== Tires ===
Dunlop DT3 19-inch flat track tires.

=== Fuel ===
Sunoco Supreme 112
