= Briar Bauman =

American motorcycle racer

- Briar Bauman, Calistoga Half-Mile, July 29, 2017
- Nationality: American
- Current team: Zanotti Racing Indian Scout FTR750

Briar Bauman is an American Flat Track racer from the United States. He is a two-time AFT Grand National Champion, having won the title in 2019 and 2020. He achieved the second place at 2018 X Games Harley-Davidson Flat-Track and the third place at the AFT twins in 2018.
