= Jared Mees =

American motorcycle racer

- Mees at Calistoga Half-Mile in 2017
- Born: April 16, 1986 (age 40); Honey Brook Township, Pennsylvania, U.S.

Jared Mees (born April 16, 1986) is an American former professional dirt track motorcycle racer. He competed in the AMA Grand National Championship winning the overall title nine times. He also won the Grand National Twins Championship in 2009 and 2011, and the Grand National Singles Championship in 2012.

Maes is married to former professional motorcycle racer Nichole Cheza.

== AMA Pro Flat Track ==
Mees secured the 2017 American Flat Track Championship with a victory at the Williams Grove Half-Mile event, clinching the championship with two rounds remaining in the season.

Jared Mees at the Sturgis TT 2017.

== Superprestigio Dirt Track ==
As the 2014 Grand National Champion, Mees was invited to participate in the Superprestigio Dirt Track race on December 13, 2014, at the Palau Sant Jordi in Barcelona, Spain. He placed second to MotoGP Champion Marc Marquez in the final.

On December 12, 2015, Mees would again compete in the Superprestigio Dirt Track against a host of international racers and also against his countryman, Brad Baker.

== X Games Harley-Davidson Flat-Track ==
Mees also competed in the 2015 X Games Harley-Davidson Flat-Track, leading until the final lap when his machine broke.

== Indian Motorcycle Race 750 Test Rider ==
Mees tested for Indian Motorcycle as an Indian Scout FTR750 rider.

== Career highlights ==
- 2002: Sportster Performance Champion – Harley-Davidson Sportster
- 2004: AMA Rookie of the Year – Harley-Davidson XR-750
- 2005: First Grand National race, Lima, OH – Harley-Davidson XR-750
- 2006: 2nd, AMA Grand National Championship, First GNC Victory, Saluda, VA GNC Half-Mile Twins– Harley-Davidson XR-750
- 2009: AMA Grand National Twins Champion – Harley-Davidson XR-750
- 2011: AMA Grand National Expert Twins Champion – Harley-Davidson XR-750
- 2012: AMA Grand National Champion – Harley-Davidson XR-750, Honda CRF450R
- 2012: AMA Grand National Singles Champion – Honda CRF450R
- 2014: AMA Grand National Champion – Harley-Davidson XR-750, Honda CRF450R
- 2015: AMA Grand National Champion, Winner of inaugural Superprestigio of the Americas – Harley-Davidson XR-750, Honda CRF450R
- 2017: AMA Grand National Champion – Indian Scout FTR750
- 2018: AMA Grand National Champion – Indian
- 2021: AMA Grand National Champion – Indian
- 2022: AMA Grand National Champion – Indian
- 2023: AMA Grand National Champion – Indian
- 2024: AMA Grand National Champion – Indian

Preceded by Bryan Smith	American Flat Track Champion; 2017	Succeeded by Present
