= Kawasaki Ninja 650R =

Japanese motorcycle produced 2006-2017

Kawasaki Ninja 650
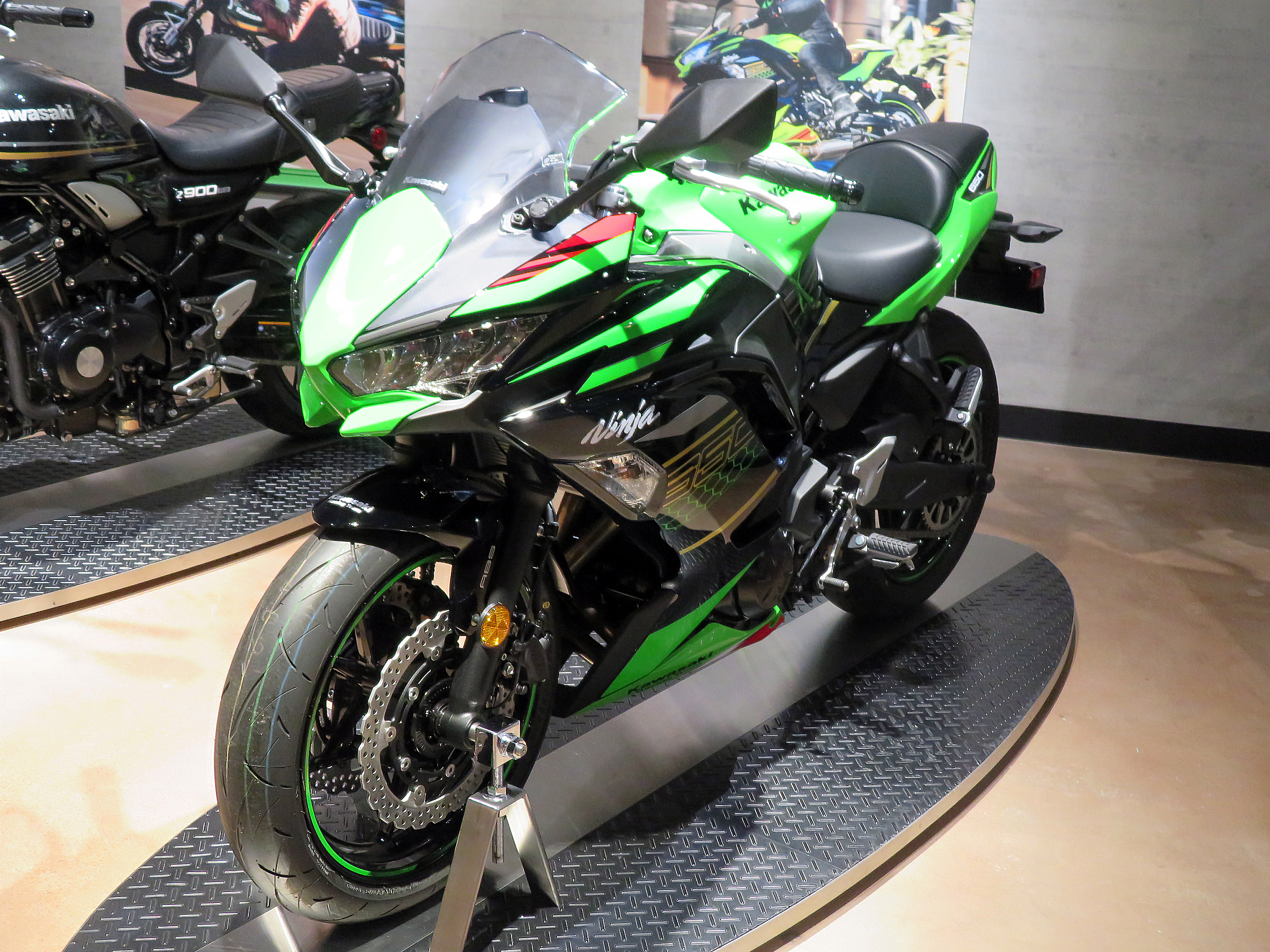
- Manufacturer: Kawasaki Motors
- Also called: Kawasaki ER-6f/EX-6; Ninja 650R (2005-2011)
- Parent company: Kawasaki Heavy Industries
- Production: 2005–present
- Class: Standard
- Engine: 649 cc (39.6 cu in), liquid-cooled, DOHC, parallel twin with digital fuel injection
- Bore / stroke: 83.0 mm × 60.0 mm (3.27 in × 2.36 in)
- Compression ratio: 10.8:1
- Transmission: 6-speed sequential cassette-style
- Suspension: Front: 41 mm hydraulic telescopic fork, 4.9 in travel Rear: Single offset laydown shock with adjustable preload; 5.1 in travel
- Brakes: Front: Dual 300 mm petal disc with 2-Piston caliper Rear: Single 220 mm Petal disc with hydraulic caliper
- Tires: Front: 120/70-17; Rear: 160/60-17
- Rake, trail: 25°, 110 mm (4.3 in)
- Wheelbase: 1,410 mm (56 in)
- Dimensions: L: 2,110 mm (83 in); W: 770 mm (30 in); H: 1,180 mm (46 in)
- Seat height: 805 mm (31.7 in)
- Weight: 186 kg (410 lb) (dry); 211 kg (465 lb) (wet)
- Fuel capacity: 16 L (3.5 imp gal; 4.2 US gal)
- Related: Kawasaki Versys 650; Kawasaki Ninja 250R; Kawasaki Ninja 400R; Kawasaki Ninja 500R

The Kawasaki Ninja 650, also called ER-6f or EХ-6, is a motorcycle in the Ninja series from the Japanese manufacturer Kawasaki Motors sold since 2006. In 2012, the R suffix was dropped from its name. It is a middleweight, parallel-twin engined motorcycle, designed for normal use on paved roads. They have modern styling and features, with low-seating ergonomics and a low center of gravity. The engine has a 180° crankshaft, resulting in an uneven firing interval of 180° and 540°.

== Overview ==
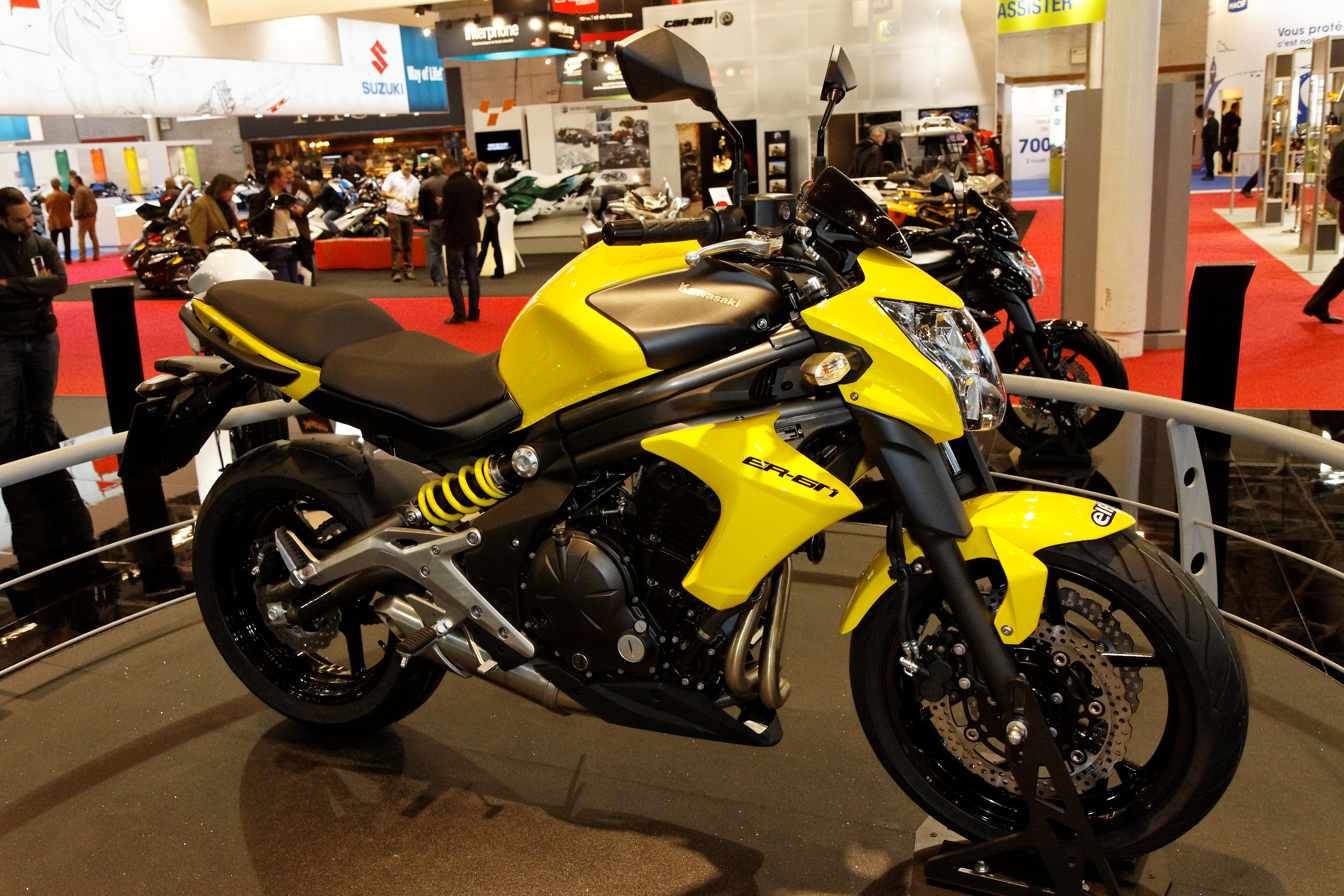
2011 Kawasaki ER-6N

The 650R and its naked sibling, the ER-6n, were introduced in 2006. The naked ER-6n was not sold in North America until the 2009 model year. The motorcycle fits above the Ninja 250R and Ninja 500R models, which already existed in Kawasaki's sportbike lineup, which includes the Ninja ZX models. For 2009, Kawasaki released an updated Ninja 650R which includes new bodywork, mirrors, gauges, lighting, and a new tune on the same 649 cc (39.6 cu in) engine. Along with chassis and minor tweaks, an all-new bodywork design was introduced to the 2012 Ninja 650 and ER-6n along with a new 2-piece seat assembly, 20mm wider handlebars, and a new tachometer above an LCD that shows speed, trip meters, fuel consumption, etc. The new Ninja 650 also comes equipped with an Economical Riding Indicator which activates when the bike is consuming low amounts of fuel.

2017 Kawasaki Ninja 650

For 2017 Kawasaki has updated the Ninja 650 with a new trellis style frame adding to the new lighter weight and better handling. With new sharper styling it has done away with the distinctive side mount rear shock for a more conventional one, it has also added a slipper clutch.

== Other versions ==
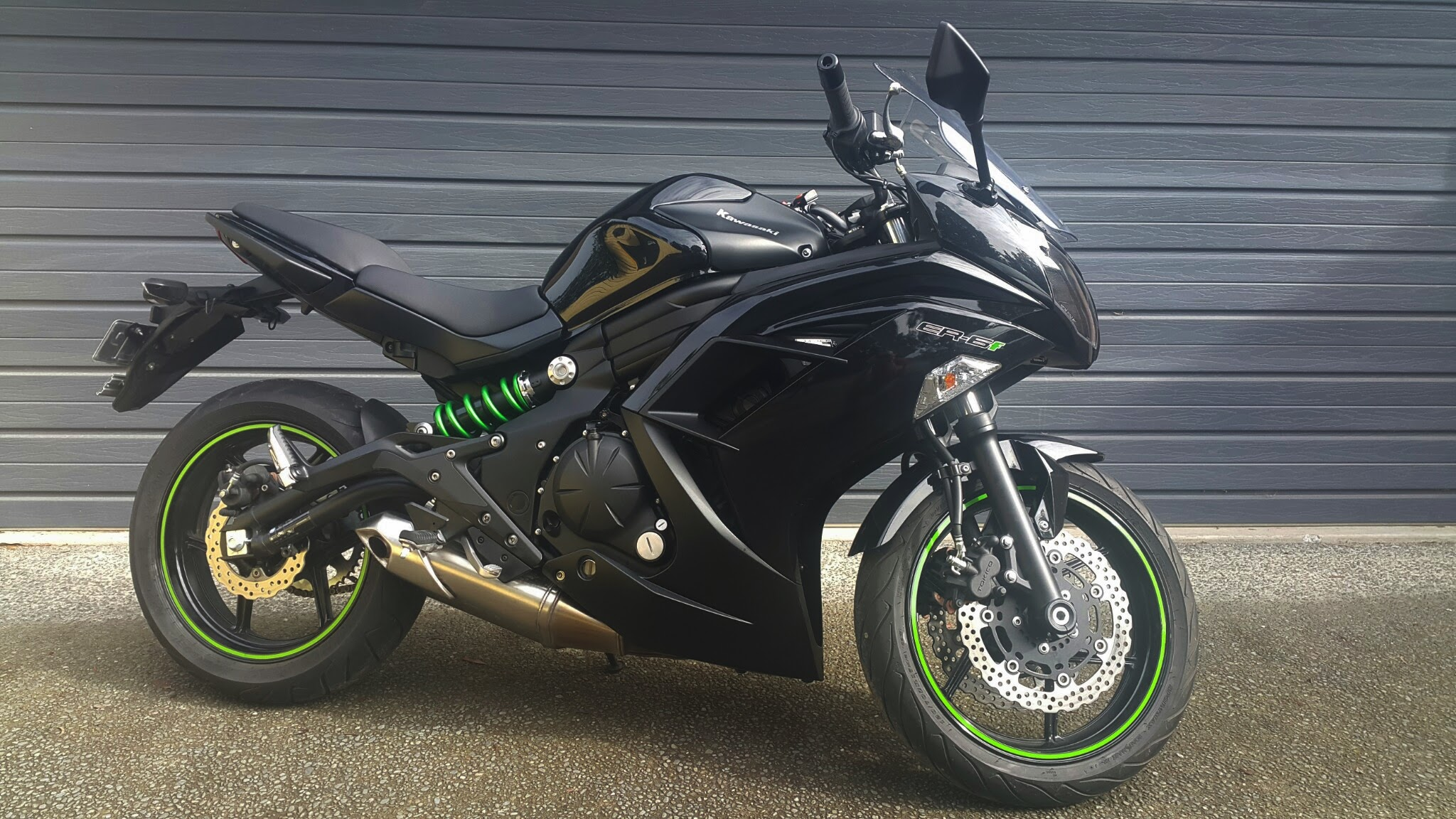
2006 Ninja 650R

In Europe the Ninja 650R is sold as the ER-6f ("f" denoting faired), the "naked" roadster version is sold as the ER-6n. In 2009, Kawasaki introduced the ER-6n in the USA. The ER-6f differs slightly from the Ninja 650R, as it features the passenger handlebars as standard (as does the ER-6n). In addition, the option of ABS brakes was made available for both the ER-6n and ER-6f. There is also a derivative of the ER-6 called the Versys which utilizes many of the same components. In many European countries the 6n naked version has proven more popular than the ER-6f; however in other countries, such as Australia and India, the faired Ninja 650R has proven to be more popular than the un-faired ER-6n, becoming the most popular 'sports-tourer' in the Kawasaki lineup. Production has stopped for the ER-6n model since 2018, it has been replaced by the Z650 series.

== Specifications ==
Model Year	2006-2008	2009-2011	2012-present
Engine
Engine Type	649 cc, liquid-cooled, 4-stroke parallel twin		
Bore/Stroke	83.0 mm × 60.0 mm (3.27 in × 2.36 in)		
Compression Ratio	11.3:1		11.3:1
Power	53 kW (71 hp) @ 8,500 rpm (claimed) 64.8 hp (48.3 kW) @ 9,000 rpm (rear wheel)		53 kW (71 hp) @ 8,500 rpm (claimed)
Torque	66.0 N⋅m (48.7 lb⋅ft) @ 7,000 rpm (claimed) 44.7 lb⋅ft (60.6 N⋅m) @ 7,250 rpm (rear wheel)		64 N⋅m (47 lb⋅ft) @ 7,000 rpm (claimed)
Valve Train	DOHC, four valves per cylinder		
Fuel Delivery	Digital fuel injection, 38 mm Keihin throttle bodies		
Ignition	Digital CDI		
Lubrication System	Semi-dry sump, SAE 10W-40		
Drivetrain
Transmission	6-speed w/multi-plate clutch		
Gear Ratios 1st 2nd 3rd 4th 5th 6th	39/16 (2.438); 36/21 (1.714); 32/24 (1.333); 30/27 (1.111); 28/29 (0.966); 23/27 (0.852)		
Primary Reduction Ratio	88/42 (2.095)		
Final Reduction Ratio	46/15 (3.067)		
Final Drive	O-ring chain		
Chassis/Suspension/Brakes
Front Suspension	41 mm hydraulic telescopic fork, 120 mm (4.7 in) travel		41 mm hydraulic telescopic fork, 4.9 in travel
Rear Suspension	Single offset laydown shock w/adjustable preload; 125 mm (4.9 in) travel		Single offset laydown shock w/adjustable preload; 5.1 in travel
Front Brakes	Dual 300 mm petal discs with 2-piston calipers, optional ABS		
Rear Brakes	Single 220 mm petal disc with single-piston caliper, optional ABS		
Front Tire	120/70ZR-17M/C 58W		
Rear Tire	160/60ZR-17M/C 69W		
Dimensions
Length	2,105 mm (82.9 in)		2,110 mm (83.1 in)
Width	760 mm (29.9 in)		770 mm (30.3 in)
Height	1,210 mm (47.6 in)	1,270 mm (50.0 in)	1,180 mm (46.5 in)
Wheelbase	1,410 mm (55.5 in)		
Seat Height	790 mm (31.1 in); 785 mm (30.9 in) (ER-6n)		805 mm (31.7 in)
Dry Weight	178 kg (392 lb), 182 kg (401 lb) w/ABS; 174 kg (384 lb) (ER-6n)		
Wet Weight			211 kg (465 lb)
Gross vehicle weight rating			361 kg (796 lb)
Fuel Capacity	15.5 litres (3.4 imp gal; 4.1 US gal)		16 litres (3.5 imp gal; 4.2 US gal)
Oil Capacity	2.4 litres (2.5 US qt)		
Rake	25° 24.5° (ER-6n)		25°
Trail	106 mm (4.2 in); 102 mm (4.0 in) (ER-6n)		110 mm (4.3 in)

== Performance ==
Model Year	2006–2009
1/4 mile	12.06 sec @ 108.79 mph (175.08 km/h)
Roll-On, 60-80 mph	3.58 sec

== Operators ==
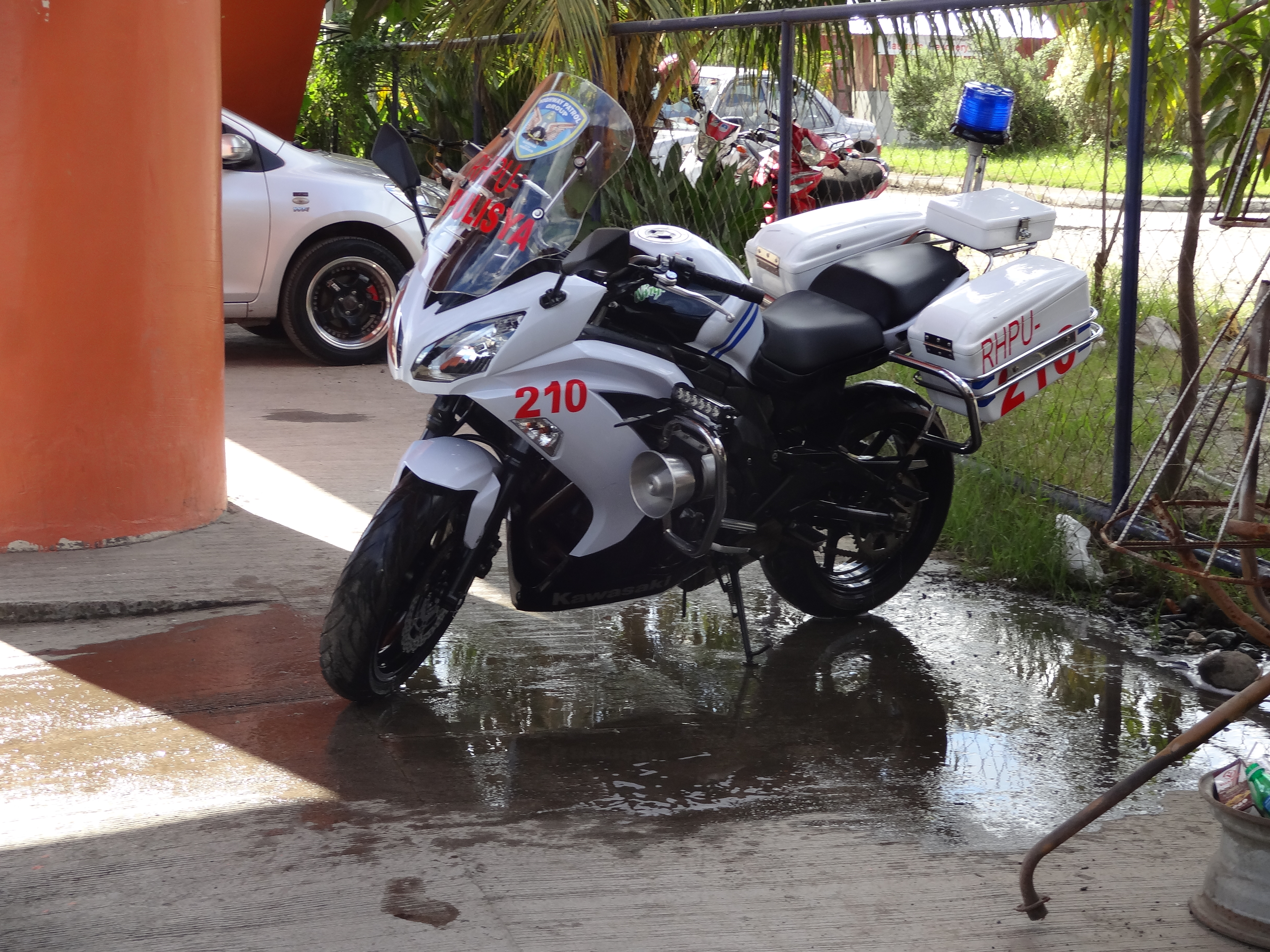
A Highway Patrol Group Ninja 650

- Philippines: 211 Units of 2016 Kawasaki 650R transferred to the Highway Patrol Group during Aquino Administration.

== See also ==
- Kawasaki Ninja series
