= American Flat Track =

American motorcycle racing series

- Category: Flat track
- Country: United States
- Inaugural season: 1946 (as single-event National Championship); 1954 (as multi-round Grand National Championship); 2017 (rebranded as American Flat Track)
- Constructors: Indian, Harley-Davidson, Yamaha, KTM, Royal Enfield
- Riders' champion: Briar Bauman (SuperTwins)
- Makes' champion: Indian
- Official website: americanflattrack.com

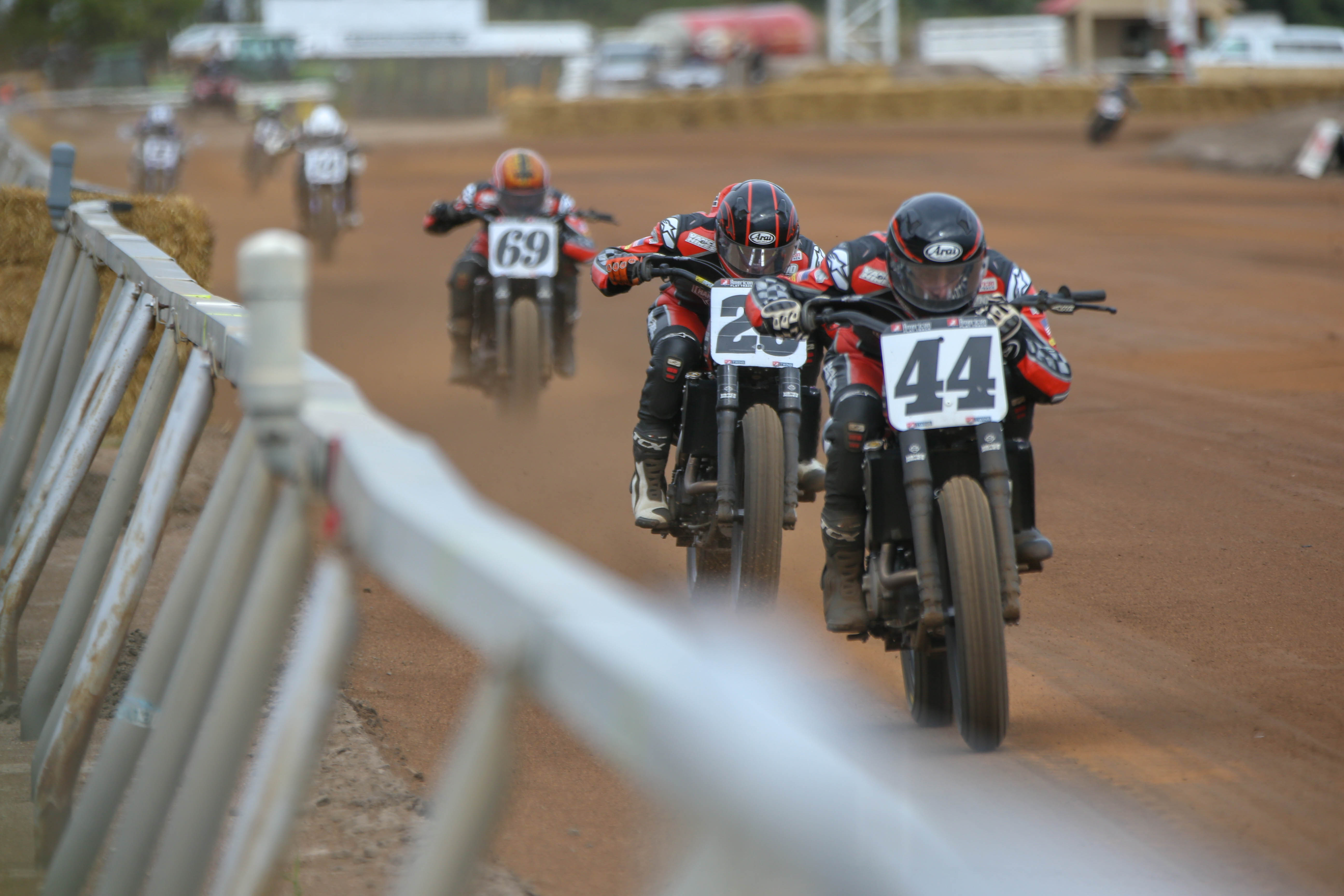
Brandon Robinson

American Flat Track is an American motorcycle racing series. The racing series, founded and sanctioned by the American Motorcyclist Association (AMA) in 1954, originally encompassed five distinct forms of competitions including mile dirt track races, half-mile, short-track, TT steeplechase and road races. The championship was the premier motorcycle racing series in the United States from the 1950s up until the late 1970s.

Following the 2016 season, AMA Pro Racing, the sanctioning body of the series, announced a restructured class system as well as a re-envisioning of the event format. The restructured class system consists of the AFT SuperTwins premier class, the AFT Singles class for young rising stars and later on the AFT Production Twins class featuring production-based, 649-800cc twin-cylinder engines.

== History ==
=== Harley versus Indian ===
In 1932, the AMA sanctioned a racing class called the Class A Dirt Track championship allowing for motorcycle manufacturers to enter prototype machinery. In 1933, the AMA introduced a new class called Class C which featured street-legal motorcycles in an effort to make motorcycle racing less expensive for ordinary motorcyclists. When manufacturers cut back on racing budgets during the Great Depression, it spelled the end of Class A competition and the Class C championship became the most important championship. AMA crowned Indian-mounted Woodsie Castonguay its first Class C National Champion in 1935, and the final Class A champion was crowned in 1938. In the years prior to World War II, the Class C championship helped fuel an intense rivalry between Harley-Davidson and Indian, the two major American manufacturers of the period. During the Second World War there were no championships held between 1942 and 1945.

From 1946 to 1953, the AMA Grand National Champion was crowned based on the results of a single race, the Springfield Mile held at the Illinois State Fairgrounds Racetrack. Side-valve engines had a maximum displacement of 750cc, while overhead valve engines were limited to 500cc.

In 1954, the Grand National Championship series was introduced, featuring five different types of competitions: four of the competitions (Mile, Half-mile, TT, and Short Track) were held on dirt tracks, while the fifth was held on asphalt-paved courses. With the demise of the Indian motorcycle company in 1953, the Harley-Davidson factory was left to dominate the series. Harley-Davidson rider Joe Leonard won the first Grand National Championship in 1954 and won the title twice more before moving on to a career in auto racing. Carroll Resweber became the first four-time champion, winning four consecutive championships for Harley-Davidson from 1958 to 1961. Since 1961 short-track events became part of the Championship; those races had a 250cc displacement limit.

=== British Invasion ===
In the 1960s, British manufacturers seeking to bolster sales in the burgeoning American motorcycle market, began to compete in the championship. Dick Mann won the national title for BSA in 1963, marking the first victory for a foreign manufacturer. Triumph would win three Grand National championships in four years with Gary Nixon winning back-to-back titles in 1967 and 1968, and Gene Romero taking another title in 1970.

=== The Japanese arrival ===
New regulations for 1969 eliminated the displacement penalty for overhead valve engines; in dirt track events brakes were permitted for the first time. Mann would win a second crown for BSA in 1971 before the British motorcycle industry collapsed in the face of stiff technological competition from Japanese manufacturers. In 1973, Yamaha's Kenny Roberts would win the first Grand National championship for a Japanese company. Since 1973 the displacement limit for short-track events was increased to 360cc, but multi-cylinder two-stroke engines were still limited to 250cc.

In 1975 the championship gained full sponsorship from R.J. Reynolds Tobacco and became known as Camel Pro Series. Between 1979 and 1982 the series was named Winston Pro Series, reverting to Camel brand in 1983.

In 1976 dirt track engines were limited to a maximum of two cylinders; in 1977 the short track engines were limited to 250cc and limited to one cylinder. When the Yamaha team withdrew from the Grand National championship after the 1977 season, Harley-Davidson was left once again to dominate the series. By 1983, the Grand National Championship had become the best attended form of dirt track racing in America, either on two wheels or four wheels. This would be the high point for the championship, as other forms of motorcycle racing such as motocross and road racing began to overtake dirt tracking in popularity.

Tammy Jo Kirk became the first woman to score GNC points in 1983. In 1984, Honda entered the championship and broke the Harley-Davidson stranglehold with Ricky Graham winning the championship. Honda followed with three consecutive national championships by Bubba Shobert before they withdrew in 1987, leaving Harley-Davidson once again as the sole major manufacturer in the series. In 1984 short-track rules granted a 500cc displacement limit for four-stroke engines.

In the 1970s and on into the 1980s, the Grand National Championship proved to be a fertile training ground for world champion road racers. AMA dirt track racers such as Kenny Roberts, Freddie Spencer, Eddie Lawson and Wayne Rainey all went on to win the 500cc road racing world championship. The motorcycle road racing technology of the late 1970s featured engines with power in excess of what the frames and tires of the day could handle. The resulting tire spin created a style of riding more reminiscent of dirt track riding, where sliding the rear tire to one side is used as a method to steer the motorcycle around a corner. This proved to be a great advantage to American dirt track racers who were accustomed to sliding their motorcycles. As Grand Prix motorcycle racing evolved into its current MotoGP formula with electronic traction control limiting rear wheel sliding, the advantage once held by former dirt trackers has been diminished.

=== Harley returns to dominance ===
After the departure of the Honda team in 1987, the Harley-Davidson factory racing team dominated the series with rider Scott Parker winning nine national championships within an eleven-year period. During this period, dirt track racing continued its decline, partly due to the fact that motocross and road racing motorcycles could be purchased directly from the manufacturers, whereas dirt track racers had to be hand-built.

=== Restructuring ===
In 1986, the AMA recognized the changing nature of motorcycle racing by making the Grand National Championship into a dirt-track-only series; road-racing rounds were branched off into a separate championship which eventually became the AMA Superbike Championship. In that season Camel sanctioned both series which were named Camel Pro Dirt Track Series and Camel Pro Road Racing Series.

In 1987 and 1988 the sponsorship strategy changed again and the Camel Pro Series name referred to a particular series based on selected rounds from both Grand National and Superbike championships.

New rules for 1987 banned two-stroke engines from dirt track races; single cylinder engines had a maximum displacement of 600cc, while twin-cylinder had a 750cc limit. Since 1989 only twin-cylinder engines were allowed in mile and half-mile events. Since 1989 the Camel Pro Series reverted as title sponsor for the Grand National Championship; the sponsorship lasted until the end of 1992 season. New dirt track classes were also introduced designed to attract young riders to the sport and, new rules for machinery were adopted in an effort to make it easier for motorcyclists to compete with motorcycles readily available from manufacturers. While the Grand National Championship is no longer the premier racing series in the United States, it continues to have a loyal following.

In 2002 the single cylinder engines were limited to 550cc (push-rod) or 505cc (OHC); the twin-cylinder class was expanded to include production-derived engines up to 1250cc.

In 2006 the Grand National Championship was split into two separate series: Grand National Championship Singles (for short track and TT events) and Grand National Championship Twins (for half mile and mile events); no overall title was awarded, although in 2007 there was a de facto champion by virtue of winning both championships. Single-cylinder engines were limited to 450cc.

Since 2010 the Grand National Champion title was reinstated and awarded to the rider who scores the most combined points. New manufacturers began to enter and find success in the sport. In 2010, Ducati earned its first GNC win. On August 24, 2013, three different OEMs finished on the podium for the first time since 1972. One week later, Harley-Davidson failed to make the podium for the first time since 1987.

For 2017, the Grand National Championship was rebranded as the American Flat Track Championship. Changes were also made to the classification of motorcycles, logo, race format, and rules. NBCSN will air the championship tape-delayed in prime weekend time slots and all live event coverage is available via TrackPass on NBC Sports Gold.

== Events ==
- The Mile: A race held on an oval-shaped dirt course approximately one mile in length. The races became popular because of the availability of horse racing venues around the country, and are typically held during the off-season for horse racing. These events usually favour motorcycles with larger engine displacements such as the Indian Motorcycle FTR750 and Harley-Davidson XG750R. The races usually feature numerous lead changes with speeds of up to 140 miles per hour.
- The Half-Mile: An event similar to a mile race, also held on an oval-shaped dirt course with a shorter lap distance. Despite the distance, tracks may vary in length, because they are often held on the same venues that hold World of Outlaws car events.
- Short Track: A race held on an oval-shaped dirt course approximately a quarter mile in length. These tight courses have been held indoors at venues such as the Houston Astrodome and favour lighter motorcycles based on two-stroke motocross machinery.
- TT Steeplechase: A race held on an irregularly shaped dirt course which usually features one right hand turn and one jump. This event also favours lighter motorcycles, but larger motorcycles have also been successful. The initials TT stand for Tourist Trophy, taking its name from the days when street-legal motorcycles were known as touring motorcycles hence, a tourist trophy (TT) signified a race classification for street-legal motorcycles. Some races are billed as Super TT, which also integrate elements of supermoto. The Sturgis Motorcycle Rally round is billed as such, with tarmac, dirt, and various turns on both surfaces.

== AFT SuperTwins ==
=== Championship ===
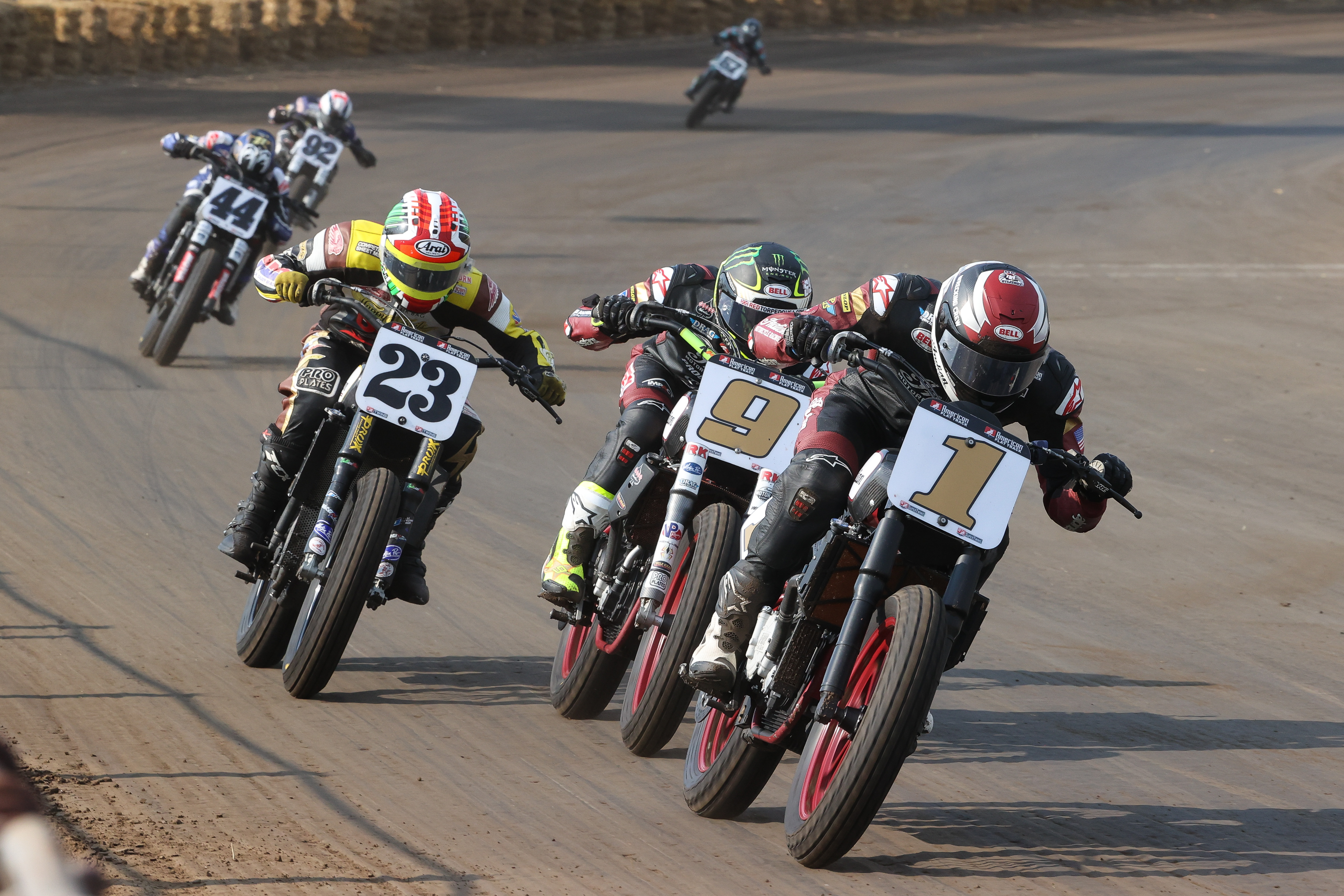
Briar Bauman leads the AFT SuperTwins pack at the 2020 Springfield Mile. Photo: Brian J Nelson

AFT SuperTwins is the pinnacle of dirt track motorcycle racing globally, and has been since the professional ranks were formalized as the Grand National Championship in 1954. Riders in this class represents a unity of elite teams and the most-skilled athletes who compete at every round of AFT competition. Each will race on custom-built, twin-cylinder motorcycles generating 90+ horsepower race bar-to-bar at speeds in excess of 140 mph, often drafting to the finish line and requiring a photo finish to determine the race winner. The motorcycles in this class contain the latest in motorsport technology and will be piloted by the fastest two-wheeled athletes on dirt.

==== Specifications ====
- Horsepower: 90+
- Minimum weight: 310 lbs.
- Top speed: 140+ MPH
- 0–60 mph: Under 4 seconds
- Tires: Dunlop, 19-inch, purpose-built flat track tires
- Fuel: VP Racing Fuels T4+ Unleaded
- Eligible engines: Only 4-stroke twin-cylinder engines with prior, written approval by AMA Pro Racing are eligible for competition in AFT Twins. This includes both production engines designed for street motorcycles and racing-only engines.
- Engine displacement: 649cc – 900cc with restrictions
  - Production engines: Engines that were originally under 750cc may be bored and stroked but may not exceed 750cc as a final displacement.
  - Racing-only engines: Engines may not exceed 750cc with a maximum allowable overbore of 0.045” per cylinder. Liquid cooled racing-only engines may not exceed 750cc. There is no provision for overbore.

== AFT Singles ==
The AFT Singles class is geared for cultivating young dirt track talent as riders hone their skills en route to the AFT Twins ranks. competitors make their mark aboard production-based 450cc single-cylinder motorcycles offering upwards of 60 horsepower. Racing at speeds faster than 115 mph.

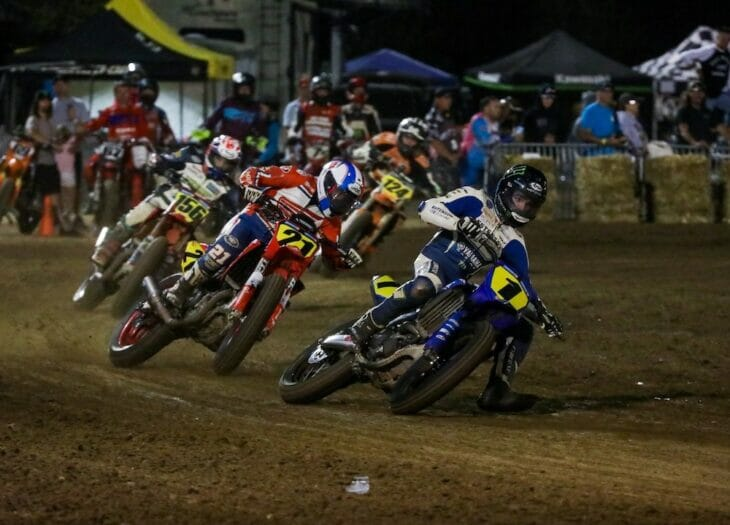
The AFT Singles at the 2021 Springfield Short Track.

=== Specifications ===
- Horsepower: 60+
- Minimum weight: 230 lbs.
- Top speed: 115+ MPH
- 0–60 mph: Under 4 seconds
- Tires: Dunlop, 19-inch, purpose-built flat track tires
- Fuel: VP Racing Fuels C10 Unleaded
- Eligible engines: Only 4-stroke single-cylinder motorcycles homologated by AMA Pro Racing may be used in AFT Singles competition. AMA Pro Racing will only review applications for homologation from motorcycle manufacturers or their distributors or designated representatives. Once a motorcycle has been approved, it may be used until such time that it no longer complies with the technical rules.
- Engine displacement: 251 – 450cc 4-stroke single-cylinder engines.
- All single-cylinder engine displacements are absolute, with no overbore allowances.
- Single-cylinder engines must maintain stock bore and stroke.

== AFT Production Twins ==
As AFT Singles riders progress and set their sights on becoming an AFT Twins rider, the AFT Production Twins class gives up-and-coming athletes the opportunity to race an AFT track on a twin-cylinder race bike without competing against the heavy hitters in contention for the AFT Twins championship. This class serves as a transition between the AFT Singles and AFT Twins classes.

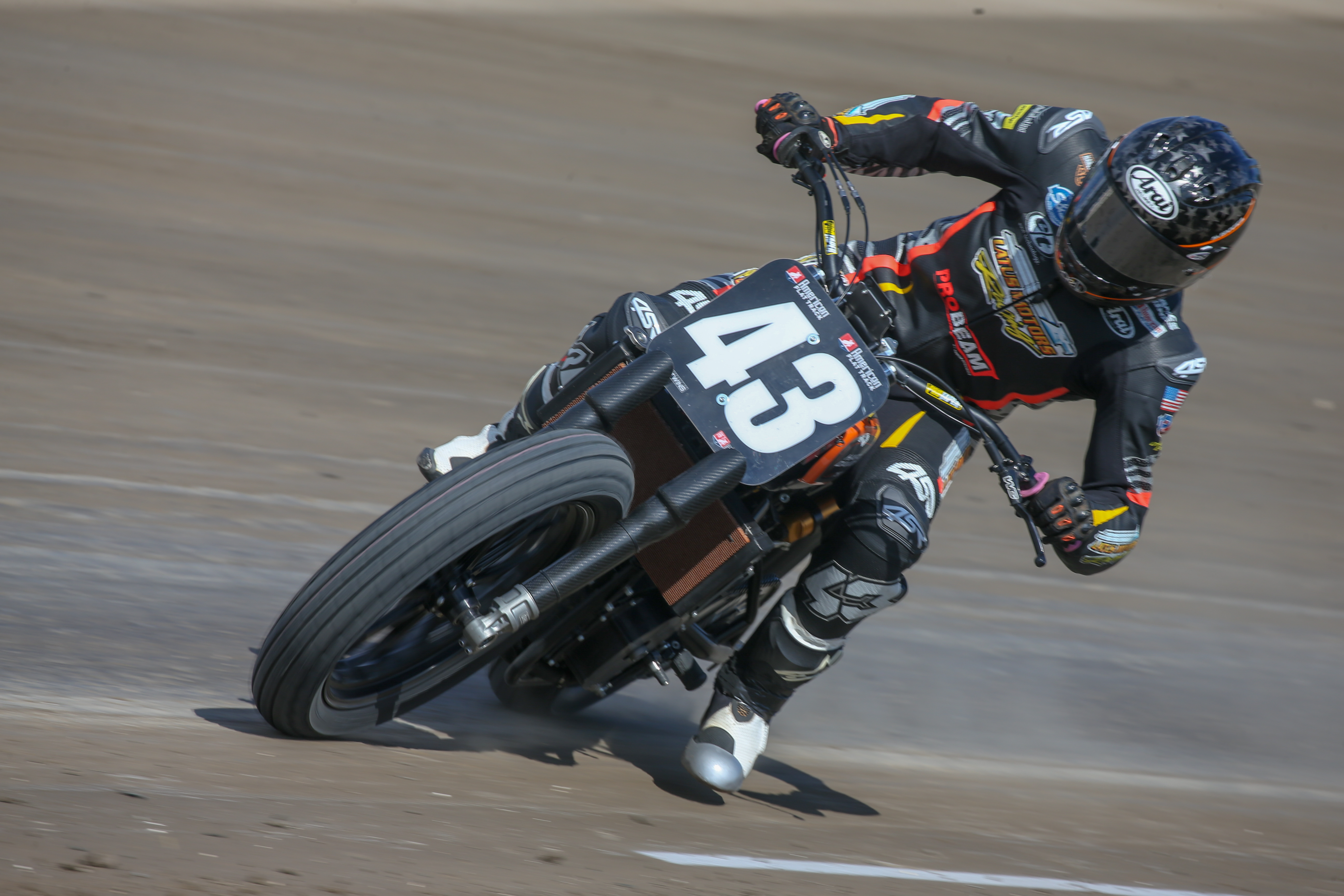
James Rispoli on the No. 43 Latus Motors Racing Harley-Davidson XG750R in the AFT Production Twins class.

=== Specifications ===
- Horsepower: 90+
- Minimum Weight: 310 lbs.
- Top speed: 140+ MPH
- 0–60 mph: Under 4 seconds
- Tires: Dunlop, 19-inch, purpose-built flat track tires
- Fuel: VP Racing Fuels C10 Unleaded
- Eligible engines: Only 4-stroke twin-cylinder mass-production engines with prior, written approval by AMA Pro Racing are eligible for competition in AFT Production Twins. The original engine crank cases or OEM replacements must be utilized to qualify as a production engine.
- Engine displacement: (649cc – 800cc with the following restrictions):
  - Production engines: Production engines may not exceed 800cc. Bore and stroke may be modified to meet this maximum displacement limit.

== Broadcasting ==
American Flat Track race broadcasts are produced by NASCAR Productions LLC.

NBC Sports held the contract from 2017 to 2021. All 18 rounds air one-hour, tape-delayed telecasts on various nights throughout the summer and fall. Every session was streamed live on NBC Sports Gold's TrackPass.

For the 2022 season, AFT will air on Fox Sports 1 and Fox Sports 2, with NASCAR Productions producing the broadcasts.

Starting in 2022, international broadcasts are now airing in Brazil (Rede Bandeirantes) and Mexico (Fox Sports Mexico) as part of NASCAR media contracts in both countries because of their production of broadcasts. American Flat Track is now included in NASCAR's media rights package in those two countries that also include rights to three national NASCAR series, a regional NASCAR series, and the IMSA WeatherTech SportsCar Championship and the Michelin Pilot Challenge.

== Champions ==
Season	Class	Champion	Motorcycle	Format
1946		Chet Dykgraaf	Norton	Single dirt-track race at Springfield Mile
1947		Jimmy Chann	Harley-Davidson	Single dirt-track race at Springfield Mile
1948		Jimmy Chann	Harley-Davidson	Single dirt-track race at Springfield Mile
1949		Jimmy Chann	Harley-Davidson	Single dirt-track race at Springfield Mile
1950		Larry Headrick	Harley-Davidson	Single dirt-track race at Springfield Mile
1951		Bobby Hill	Indian	Single dirt-track race at Springfield Mile
1952		Bobby Hill	Indian	Single dirt-track race at Springfield Mile
1952		Tommy Byars	Harley-Davidson	Single dirt-track race at Springfield Mile
1953		Bill Tuman	Indian	
1954		Joe Leonard	Harley-Davidson	Combined road-racing and dirt-track events
1955		Brad Andres	Harley-Davidson	Combined road-racing and dirt-track events
1956		Joe Leonard	Harley-Davidson	Combined road-racing and dirt-track events
1957		Joe Leonard	Harley-Davidson	Combined road-racing and dirt-track events
1958		Carroll Resweber	Harley-Davidson	Combined road-racing and dirt-track events
1959		Carroll Resweber	Harley-Davidson	Combined road-racing and dirt-track events
1960		Carroll Resweber	Harley-Davidson	Combined road-racing and dirt-track events
1961		Carroll Resweber	Harley-Davidson	Combined road-racing and dirt-track events
1962		Bart Markel	Harley-Davidson	Combined road-racing and dirt-track events
1963		Dick Mann	Matchless	Combined road-racing and dirt-track events
1964		Roger Reiman	Harley-Davidson	Combined road-racing and dirt-track events
1965		Bart Markel	Harley-Davidson	Combined road-racing and dirt-track events
1966		Bart Markel	Harley-Davidson	Combined road-racing and dirt-track events
1967		Gary Nixon	Triumph	Combined road-racing and dirt-track events
1968		Gary Nixon	Triumph	Combined road-racing and dirt-track events
1969		Mert Lawwill	Harley-Davidson	Combined road-racing and dirt-track events
1970		Gene Romero	Triumph	Combined road-racing and dirt-track events
1971		Dick Mann	BSA	Combined road-racing and dirt-track events
1972		Mark Brelsford	Harley-Davidson	Combined road-racing and dirt-track events
1973		Kenny Roberts	Yamaha	Combined road-racing and dirt-track events
1974		Kenny Roberts	Yamaha	Combined road-racing and dirt-track events
1975		Gary Scott	Harley-Davidson	Combined road-racing and dirt-track events
1976		Jay Springsteen	Harley-Davidson	Combined road-racing and dirt-track events
1977		Jay Springsteen	Harley-Davidson	Combined road-racing and dirt-track events
1978		Jay Springsteen	Harley-Davidson	Combined road-racing and dirt-track events
1979		Steve Eklund	Harley-Davidson, Yamaha	Combined road-racing and dirt-track events
1980		Randy Goss	Harley-Davidson	Combined road-racing and dirt-track events
1981		Mike Kidd	Harley-Davidson, Yamaha	Combined road-racing and dirt-track events
1982		Ricky Graham	Harley-Davidson	Combined road-racing and dirt-track events
1983		Randy Goss	Harley-Davidson	Combined road-racing and dirt-track events
1984		Ricky Graham	Honda	Combined road-racing and dirt-track events
1985		Bubba Shobert	Honda	Combined road-racing and dirt-track events
1986		Bubba Shobert	Honda	Dirt-track events only Road-racing rounds not counted towards the Grand National Championship anymore.
1987		Bubba Shobert	Honda	Dirt-track events only Road-racing rounds not counted towards the Grand National Championship anymore.
1988		Scott Parker	Harley-Davidson	Dirt-track events only Road-racing rounds not counted towards the Grand National Championship anymore.
1989		Scott Parker	Harley-Davidson	Dirt-track events only Road-racing rounds not counted towards the Grand National Championship anymore.
1990		Scott Parker	Harley-Davidson	Dirt-track events only Road-racing rounds not counted towards the Grand National Championship anymore.
1991		Scott Parker	Harley-Davidson	Dirt-track events only Road-racing rounds not counted towards the Grand National Championship anymore.
1992		Chris Carr	Harley-Davidson	Dirt-track events only Road-racing rounds not counted towards the Grand National Championship anymore.
1993		Ricky Graham	Honda	Dirt-track events only Road-racing rounds not counted towards the Grand National Championship anymore.
1994		Scott Parker	Harley-Davidson	Dirt-track events only Road-racing rounds not counted towards the Grand National Championship anymore.
1995		Scott Parker	Harley-Davidson	Dirt-track events only Road-racing rounds not counted towards the Grand National Championship anymore.
1996		Scott Parker	Harley-Davidson	Dirt-track events only Road-racing rounds not counted towards the Grand National Championship anymore.
1997		Scott Parker	Harley-Davidson	Dirt-track events only Road-racing rounds not counted towards the Grand National Championship anymore.
1998		Scott Parker	Harley-Davidson	Dirt-track events only Road-racing rounds not counted towards the Grand National Championship anymore.
1999		Chris Carr	Harley-Davidson, ATK	Dirt-track events only Road-racing rounds not counted towards the Grand National Championship anymore.
2000		Joe Kopp	Harley-Davidson, Rotax	Dirt-track events only Road-racing rounds not counted towards the Grand National Championship anymore.
2001		Chris Carr	Harley-Davidson, Rotax, ATK	Dirt-track events only Road-racing rounds not counted towards the Grand National Championship anymore.
2002		Chris Carr	Harley-Davidson, Rotax, VOR, ATK	Dirt-track events only Road-racing rounds not counted towards the Grand National Championship anymore.
2003		Chris Carr	Harley-Davidson, Rotax, VOR	Dirt-track events only Road-racing rounds not counted towards the Grand National Championship anymore.
2004		Chris Carr	Harley-Davidson, Rotax, KTM	Dirt-track events only Road-racing rounds not counted towards the Grand National Championship anymore.
2005	Chris Carr	Harley-Davidson, KTM		Dirt-track events only Road-racing rounds not counted towards the Grand National Championship anymore.
2006	Twins	Kenny Coolbeth	Harley-Davidson	From 2006 to 2009, the championship was replaced by two separate series for two-cylinders (Twins) and single-cylinder (Singles) bikes. No overall title awarded. Twins events were held on mile and half-mile courses, while Singles events were held on short-track and TT courses.
2006	Singles	Jake Johnson	Suzuki	From 2006 to 2009, the championship was replaced by two separate series for two-cylinders (Twins) and single-cylinder (Singles) bikes. No overall title awarded. Twins events were held on mile and half-mile courses, while Singles events were held on short-track and TT courses.
2007	Twins	Kenny Coolbeth	Harley-Davidson	From 2006 to 2009, the championship was replaced by two separate series for two-cylinders (Twins) and single-cylinder (Singles) bikes. No overall title awarded. Twins events were held on mile and half-mile courses, while Singles events were held on short-track and TT courses.
2007	Singles	Kenny Coolbeth	Honda	From 2006 to 2009, the championship was replaced by two separate series for two-cylinders (Twins) and single-cylinder (Singles) bikes. No overall title awarded. Twins events were held on mile and half-mile courses, while Singles events were held on short-track and TT courses.
2008	Twins	Kenny Coolbeth	Harley-Davidson	From 2006 to 2009, the championship was replaced by two separate series for two-cylinders (Twins) and single-cylinder (Singles) bikes. No overall title awarded. Twins events were held on mile and half-mile courses, while Singles events were held on short-track and TT courses.
2008	Singles	Jake Johnson	Suzuki	From 2006 to 2009, the championship was replaced by two separate series for two-cylinders (Twins) and single-cylinder (Singles) bikes. No overall title awarded. Twins events were held on mile and half-mile courses, while Singles events were held on short-track and TT courses.
2009	Twins	Jared Mees	Harley-Davidson	From 2006 to 2009, the championship was replaced by two separate series for two-cylinders (Twins) and single-cylinder (Singles) bikes. No overall title awarded. Twins events were held on mile and half-mile courses, while Singles events were held on short-track and TT courses.
2009	Singles	Sammy Halbert	Yamaha	From 2006 to 2009, the championship was replaced by two separate series for two-cylinders (Twins) and single-cylinder (Singles) bikes. No overall title awarded. Twins events were held on mile and half-mile courses, while Singles events were held on short-track and TT courses.
2010	Twins	Jake Johnson	Harley-Davidson	Overall title awarded to the rider with the highest total after combining the points earned in Twins and Singles championships.
2010	Singles	Jake Johnson	Honda	Overall title awarded to the rider with the highest total after combining the points earned in Twins and Singles championships.
2011	Twins	Jake Johnson	Harley-Davidson	Overall title awarded to the rider with the highest total after combining the points earned in Twins and Singles championships.
2011	Singles	Jake Johnson	Honda	Overall title awarded to the rider with the highest total after combining the points earned in Twins and Singles championships.
2012	Twins	Jared Mees	Harley-Davidson	Overall title awarded to the rider with the highest total after combining the points earned in Twins and Singles championships.
2012	Singles	Jared Mees	Honda	Overall title awarded to the rider with the highest total after combining the points earned in Twins and Singles championships.
2013	Twins	Brad Baker	Harley-Davidson	Overall title awarded to the rider with the highest total after combining the points earned in Twins and Singles championships.
2013	Singles	Brad Baker	Honda	Overall title awarded to the rider with the highest total after combining the points earned in Twins and Singles championships.
2014	Twins	Jared Mees	Harley-Davidson	Overall title awarded to the rider with the highest total after combining the points earned in Twins and Singles championships.
2014	Singles	Jared Mees	Honda	Overall title awarded to the rider with the highest total after combining the points earned in Twins and Singles championships.
2015	Twins	Jared Mees	Harley-Davidson	Unified championship (GNC1) including both Twins and Singles events.
2015	Singles	Jared Mees	Honda	Unified championship (GNC1) including both Twins and Singles events.
2016		Bryan Smith	Kawasaki	Unified championship (GNC1) including both Twins and Singles events.
2017	Twins	Jared Mees	Indian	American Flat Track Championship
2017	Singles	Kolby Carlile	Yamaha	American Flat Track Championship
2018	Twins	Jared Mees	Indian	American Flat Track Championship
2018	Singles	Dan Bromley	KTM	American Flat Track Championship
2019	Twins	Briar Bauman	Indian	American Flat Track Championship
2019	Production Twins	Cory Texter	Yamaha	American Flat Track Championship
2019	Singles	Dalton Gaithier	Husqvarna	American Flat Track Championship
2020	SuperTwins	Briar Bauman	Indian	American Flat Track Championship
2020	Production Twins	James Rispoli	Harley-Davidson	American Flat Track Championship
2020	Singles	Dallas Daniels	Yamaha	American Flat Track Championship
2021	SuperTwins	Jared Mees	Indian	
2021	Production Twins	Cory Texter	Yamaha	
2021	Singles	Dallas Daniels	Yamaha	
2022	SuperTwins	Jared Mees	Indian	
2022	Production Twins	Jesse Janisch	Harley-Davidson	
2022	Singles	Kody Kopp	KTM	
