= Bubba Blackwell =

American motorcycle stunt performer

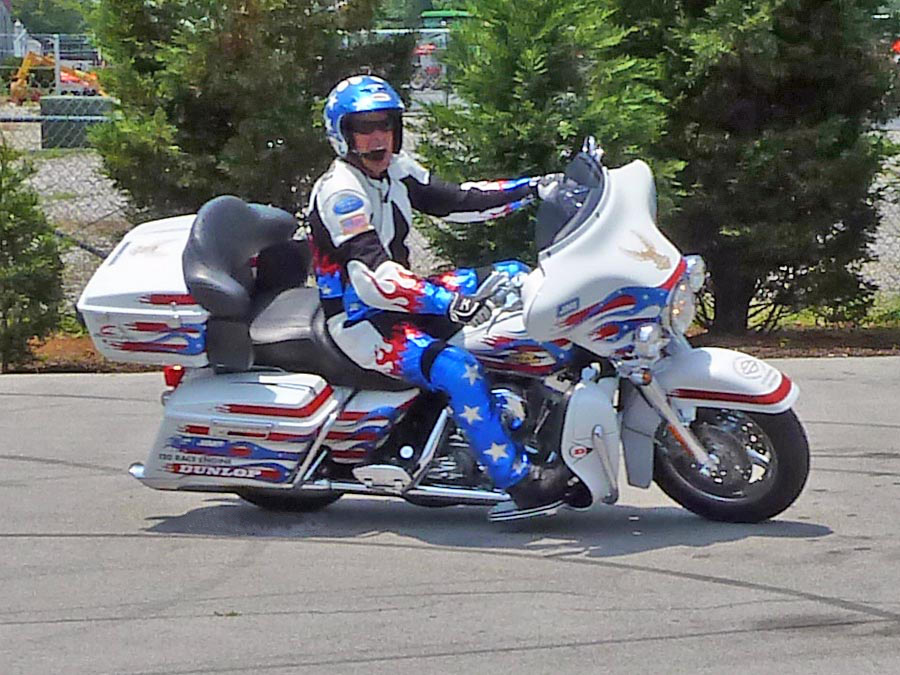
- Bubba on Harley FLHTCU stunt bike
- Born: James Blackwell; October 4, 1966 (age 60); Panama City, Florida
- Occupation: Stunt performer
- Website: Official website

James Blackwell (born October 4, 1966; known professionally as Bubba Blackwell) is an American stunt performer and motorcycle jumping world record holder who is sponsored by and promoted by the Harley-Davidson motorcycle company. Before his association with Harley, Blackwell was sponsored by the now-defunct Buell Motorcycle Company (Buell was partnered with Harley before Buell became defunct in October 2009).

Blackwell is best known for breaking Evel Knievel's jump record for buses using a Harley-Davidson XR-750 flat-track racing motorcycle.

== Records ==
Bubba Blackwell began his career on April 26, 1998, when he jumped 20 cars in Everett, Massachusetts at Boston Harley-Davidson, breaking the 19-car record held by Evel Knievel. The following year, on July 4, 1999, during an airing of The Tonight Show with Jay Leno, Blackwell jumped 14 buses at Del Mar Fair in California, tying the record held by Knievel, who leaped 14 buses at Kings Island in 1975 (although Knievel's rear tire touched the 14th bus, his landing was successful). Five months later, Blackwell broke Knievel's bus-jumping record by jumping 15 buses.

Blackwell broke Knievel's last remaining jump record on a Harley-Davidson XR-750 by jumping 52 stacked cars on October 4, 2008. The jump took place at the Deep South Speedway located between Pensacola, Florida and Mobile, Alabama. The jump also marked Blackwell's 41st birthday.

== Accidents ==
On July 4, 2001, Blackwell attempted to beat his record, attempting to jump 22 cars at Del Mar Fair. The Del Mar track was a soft dirt horse track and Blackwell lost traction and was unable to obtain the necessary speed to clear the jump. He came up short and crashed.

When motorcycle jumps go really cool and smooth, just about everybody does feel like there's nothing to it. But, you know, July 4th, 2001, there was not one person there, of the 35,000 that came, that wanted to take my place.

— Bubba Blackwell, speaking about the 2001 Del Mar Crash

The crash is featured on television series including World's Most Amazing Videos, Shockwave and on the Discovery Channel's Destroyed In Seconds.

=== Return to jumping ===
Following the Del Mar crash, Blackwell retired from jumping and limited performances to the Buell stunt show. However, in celebration of the 100th anniversary of Harley-Davidson, Blackwell returned to jumping his Harley-Davidson XR-750 at Ukes Harley-Davidson Motorcycle Dealer in Kenosha, Wisconsin on August 30, 2003.

Blackwell planned to attempt to beat the XR-750 record again on June 12, 2010, by jumping 22 Ford Focus cars at the Rockingham Park in Salem, New Hampshire. However that event was canceled.

Blackwell is still periodically jumping the XR-750. In 2013, Blackwell jumped over two helicopters with their blades rotating. He also returned to Ukes Harley-Davidson for a jump to celebrate the 110th Anniversary of Harley-Davidson.

== Cycle shows ==
=== Motorcycles ===
During a show, Blackwell rotates through several motorcycles, including:

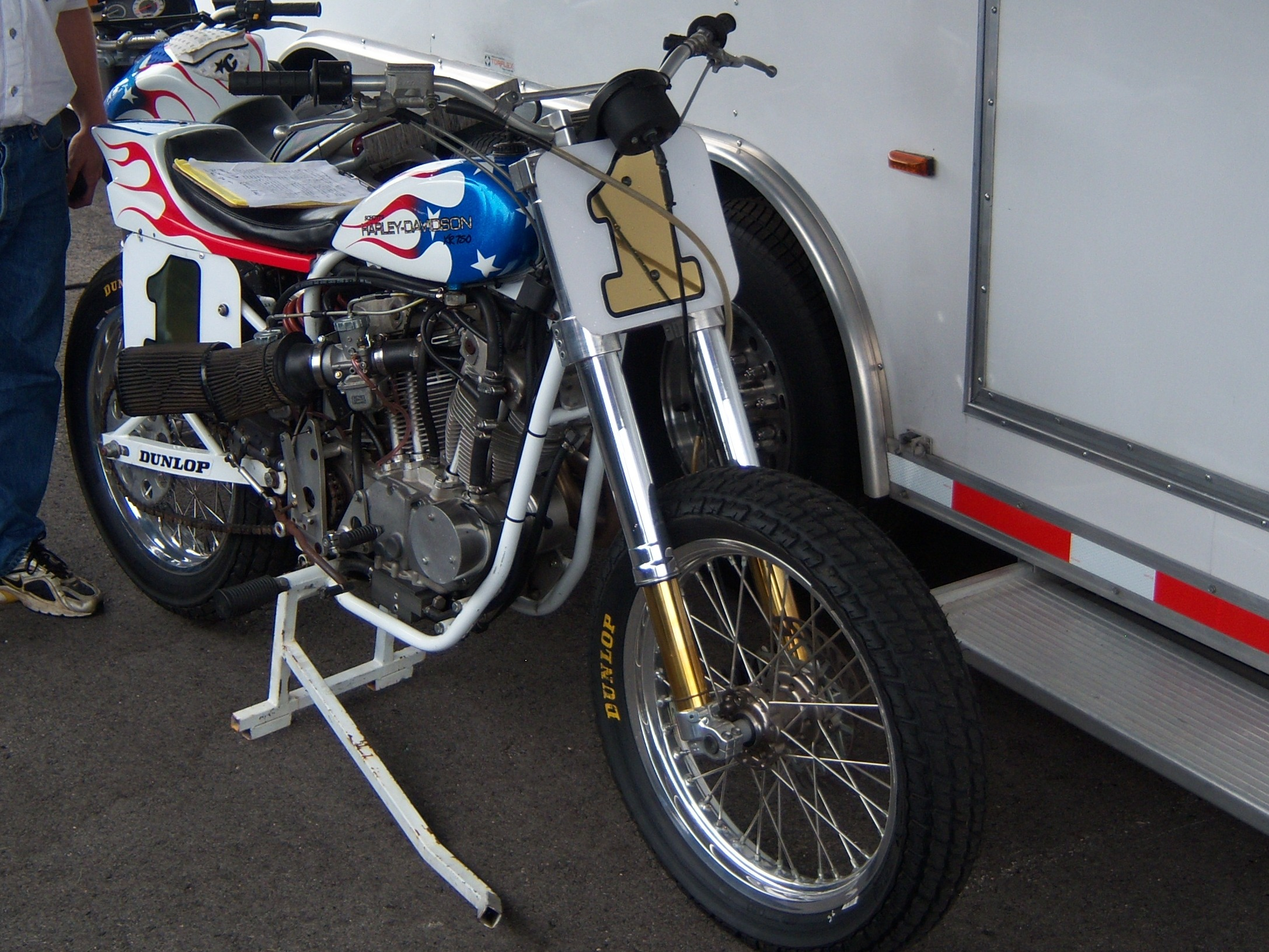
Bubba Blackwell's Harley-Davidson XR-750 jump bike at Muskegon Bike Week, August 2008

- A Harley-Davidson XR-1200 (stunt bike)
- A Harley-Davidson VRSC (stunt bike)
- A Harley-Davidson Super Glide (stunt bike)
- A Harley-Davidson FLHTCU (stunt bike)
- A Harley-Davidson XR-750 (jump bike)

Before Buell went out of business in 2009, Blackwell was sponsored by the Harley-Davidson subsidy and his stunt shows also included the Buell Blast and the Buell Lightning. Between 2010 and 2013, Blackwell discontinued using the Buell motorcycles. However, in 2014, Blackwell returned to using the Buells in his stunt shows.

=== Stunts ===
One of the highlights of the stunt show was Blackwell lifting the front wheel, doing a motorcycle wheelie, on his street-legal Harley-Davidson FLHTCU outfitted with the 120 cubic inch twin cam engine. Blackwell also performs burnouts, including going through all 5-speeds of his custom Harley-Davidson Super Glide. The burn-outs often end with the rear tire of the motorcycle blowing.

Toward the end of the Buell sponsorship, Blackwell toured with Team Bubba, which included two other stunt riders other than himself performing stunts on the Buell motorcycles. However, with the liquidation of Buell Motorcycles, Blackwell exclusively performs stunts with the Harley-Davidson twin-cam engine motorcycles and jumps on the Harley-Davidson XR-750.

=== Heirs to the Dare ===
On March 10, 2014, Discovery Channel premiered the television show, Heirs to the Dare, featuring Blackwell. Heirs to the Dare also featured stunt performers Henry "Pitbull" Rife and Super Joe Reed. The Discovery Channel describes Blackwell as "best known for breaking Evel Knievel's jump records for both cars and buses. He's known as 'king of the Harley' and he's had some really bad falls with 42 broken bones, to date. Bubba attempts jumps over objects that include helicopters with blades in full rotation as he earns big dollars for big jumps to support his family."

== Retirement ==
I’ve seen so many people come and go in this business, and I’ve never seen a good ending ...I vowed a long time ago that I wasn’t going to end up like that.

— Bubba Blackwell, speaking about his 2015 retirement

After 21 years of performing professional stunt riding for Buell Motorcycles and Harley-Davidson Motorcycles, Blackwell retired on August 15, 2015. Blackwell said of his planned retirement that he accomplished all of his dreams and enjoyed fatherhood over stunt performing. He announced his jump the weekend of August 15, 2015 in Peoria, Illinois would be his farewell performance. Blackwell said he would follow his daredevil career with a lawn care business but kept his motorcycles and jumpsuit and may one day return.

Blackwell came out of retirement on August 20, 2016, with a jump at Fox River Harley-Davidson in St. Charles, Illinois when he successfully cleared 15 Jeep Patriots after a 2-hour rain delay during the 2016 Illinois HOG Rally.
