= Harley-Davidson KR =

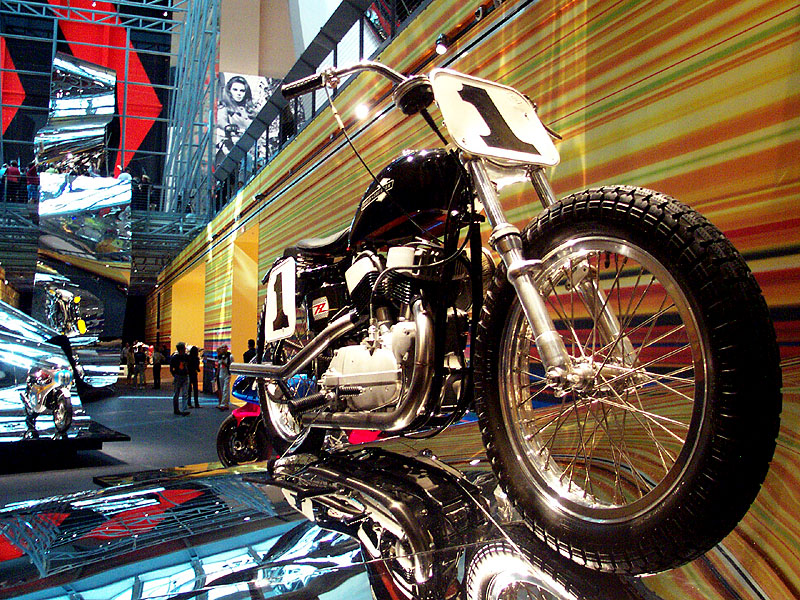
- 1963 KR at the Art of the Motorcycle Las Vegas
- Manufacturer: Harley-Davidson
- Also called: KR750
- Production: 1953–1969
- Predecessor: Harley-Davidson WR
- Successor: XR-750
- Class: Track racing
- Engine: 45.125 cu in (739.47 cc) air cooled side valve 4-stroke 45° V-twin, dry sump
- Bore / stroke: 2.745 in × 3.8125 in (69.72 mm × 96.84 mm)
- Compression ratio: 6:1 or less
- Top speed: 125 mph (201 km/h)
- Power: 50–57 hp (37–43 kW) @ 6,000–7,000 rpm
- Transmission: 4-speed, chain
- Suspension: Front: Hydraulic fork Rear: swingarm
- Brakes: none
- Weight: 320 lb (150 kg) (dry)
- Related: Model K

The Harley-Davidson KR or KR750 was a 45.125 cu in (739.47 cc) displacement V-twin engine flathead racing motorcycle was made by Harley-Davidson from 1953 through 1969 for flat track racing. It was also used in road racing in the KRTT faired version. When the KR was first introduced, it dominated motorcycle racing in the United States. In 1970 it was replaced by the long-lived and US race-winning Harley-Davidson XR-750.

== Class C racing ==
American Motorcyclist Association (AMA) Class C racing was created in 1933 in response to low participation in racing and slow motorcycle sales during the decline in consumer disposable income of the Great Depression. The year before, Harley-Davidson was the only factory team to compete. That team had but one rider, Joe Petrali, who had swept every AMA national title in 1935, due in large part to lack of competition, as well as his talent. With declining AMA rider membership, the two major factories, Harley-Davidson and Indian Motocycle Manufacturing Company, were left with greater influence over the organization, which they used to establish a uniform racing class with a low barrier to entry.

Unlike the many incompatible classes found in car racing, the new class would use the same bikes across many disciplines, including road racing and quarter-mile (short track), half-mile, and one-mile ovals, while leaving out the specialized motorcycles used in hillclimbing, and the large displacement (74 cu in (1,210 cm^{3}) open-class bikes that competed in TT (or TT Steeplechase) racing.

The Class C rules were designed to make racing accessible to the wider public, and not only well-financed professional teams and factories. Homologation rules and bike inspection were used to ensure the amateur riders in the general public could buy the same bikes as the factory team, and buy from the factory's whole catalog of speed parts as well. The displacement formula allowed side valve (or flathead) engines of up to 750cc, or 45.77", but an "equivalency rule" that limited more technically advanced OHV engines, tantamount to the (primarily UK) import competition, to 500cc, or 30.51". From the time Class C was established in 1938 until the 1953 KR, Harley-Davidson relied on the 27 hp (20 kW) WLDR, sold with lights, fenders and other equipment, intended to be ridden to the track by amateur racers, prepared by the rider and raced, and the race-only 1941-52 35 hp (26 kW) Harley-Davidson WR which was the direct ancestor of the KR.

== Development ==
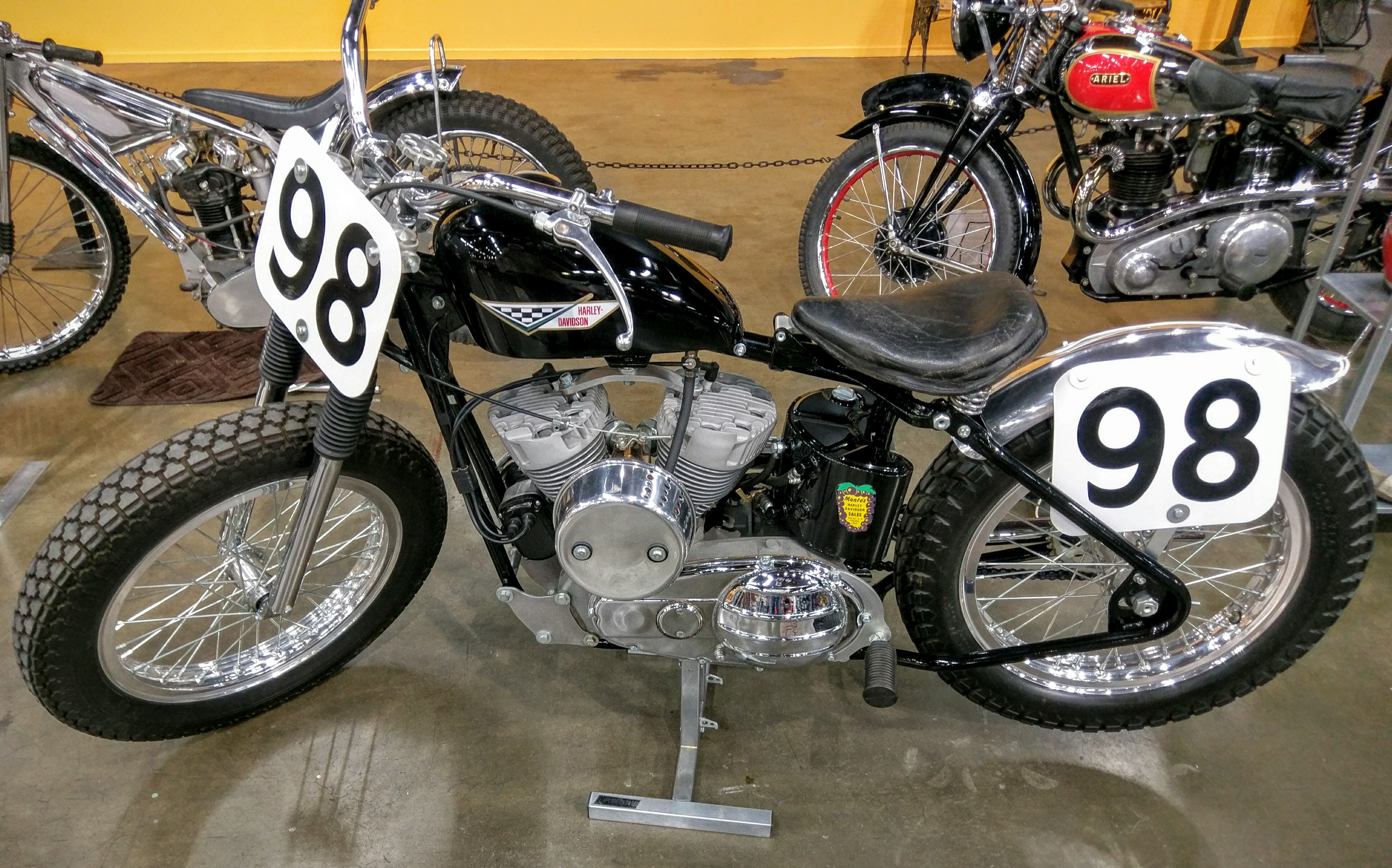
1957 Harley-Davidson KR750, on display at the California Automobile Museum

Development of the 742 cc (45.3 cu in) Model K street motorcycle began in 1950 in response to increased competition from UK brands Triumph, Norton, and BSA entering the US market in greater numbers due to post-World War II reductions in import duties, and the UK's need to boost exports. Technology found on the European imports, including a hydraulic fork front suspension, a rear swingarm, four-speed transmission, unit construction, and a hand, rather than foot, clutch control, were used on the new K and KR. Alongside the Model K street bike, the KR racer was developed to compete in Class C.

Motorcycling writer Kevin Cameron characterized Harley-Davidson as "outside the mainstream of engine development in general, to say nothing of the racing mainstream," noting that, for example, their first use of overhead valves (OHV) on a production motorcycle was one year after the last time an AMA TT race was won by an OHV engine, overhead camshaft (OHC) becoming the only competitive technology in TT racing thereafter. American brands Harley-Davidson and Indian favored flathead engines because Americans rode far longer distances than Europeans, over much rougher roads, with lower octane fuel, and had greater need for low-RPM torque than the greater power offered at higher engine speed of OHV engines. Additionally, while the low-priced Ford Model T car dominated the US motor vehicle market ever since World War I and kept motorcycling in a recreational niche market, in Europe, motorcycles were still mainstream, mass-market transportation, with sales and profits that justified ongoing technological investment. That changed after World War II, with lighter, faster and more utilitarian British imports pouring into the US as the UK was desperate for foreign currency to repay war debts, Harley-Davidson and Indian were forced to respond quickly to a newly-competitive and fast-changing market.

Indian chose to meet their competitors on their terms, imitating the OHV parallel-twin design favored by the British imports, but technical hurdles proved too great for the new engine to save the company from its demise by 1953. Harley-Davidson chose to play to their own strengths, creating a pushrod OHV V-twin engine in 1936 retaining separate transmission, and the new, for Harley-Davidson, unit construction, introduced on the 1952 Model K (still side-valve).

== KRTT road racer ==
Harley-Davidson KRTT
- Successor: XRTT
- Class: Road racing
- Engine: 45.125 cu in (739.47 cc) air cooled side valve 4-stroke 45° V-twin, dry sump
- Bore / stroke: 2.745 in × 3.8125 in (69.72 mm × 96.84 mm)
- Compression ratio: 6.3:1
- Top speed: 142 mph (229 km/h)
- Power: 48 hp (36 kW) @ 6,800 rpm
- Ignition type: Magneto
- Transmission: Multi-disc dry clutch, 4-speed, chain
- Frame type: Steel, tubular twin loop
- Suspension: Front: telescopic fork Rear: swing arm
- Brakes: Front & rear drum, 50.3 sq in (325 cm^{2})
- Tires: Front: 3.00×19; Rear: 3.50×19
- Wheelbase: 56.0 in (1,420 mm)
- Seat height: 30.0 in (760 mm)
- Weight: 386 lb (175 kg) (wet)
- Fuel capacity: 6.0 US gal (23 L; 5.0 imp gal)

Cycle World road tested a 1963 KRTT (or KR-TT) alongside a Harley-Davidson Sprint TT racer. They recorded a top speed of 142 mph (229 km/h), and 0 to 60 mph (0 to 97 km/h) acceleration of 5.8 seconds. The 0 to 1/4 mi (0.00 to 0.40 km) time was 14.1 seconds at 97 mph (156 km/h).

== Achievements ==
In 1956, every Class C race was won by a Harley-Davidson KR. From 1955 through 1969, 12 of the 15 AMA Daytona 200 national championships were won by KRs. A 1957 KR appeared in the 1999 Guggenheim Museum's The Art of the Motorcycle exhibition in New York and a 1963 KR was in the Las Vegas show. The AMA Motorcycle Hall of Fame Classic Bikes collection includes two Harley-Davidson KRs: a 1959 KR that is the last motorcycle raced by three-time AMA Grand National Champion Joe Leonard, and Mert Lawwill's 1969 KR750.

== See also ==
- List of Harley-Davidson motorcycles
- List of motorcycles of the 1950s
