= Harley-Davidson XLCR =

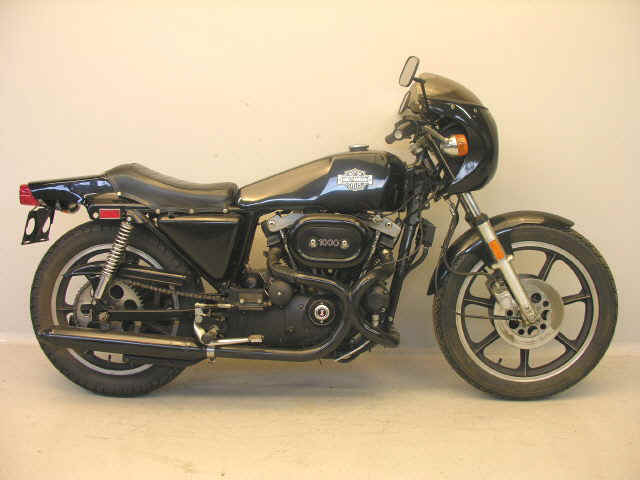
- Manufacturer: Harley-Davidson
- Production: 1977–1979
- Engine: 1000 cc OHV 45° V-twin
- Bore / stroke: 88.9 x 96.8mm
- Compression ratio: 9.0:1
- Power: 57 @ 6,000
- Torque: 67.9 @ 3,750
- Transmission: 4 speed
- Suspension: Rear: Twin Showa shocks, adjustable preload
- Rake, trail: 27.8°, 5.1"
- Wheelbase: 59.6 in.
- Weight: 530 lb (240 kg) (dry); 565 lb (256 kg) (full of gas) (wet)

The Harley-Davidson XLCR was an American café racer motorcycle manufactured by Harley-Davidson between 1977 and 1979.

Some say that designer Willie G. Davidson created it from the existing XLCH Sportster, initially as his personal vehicle.^{[1]} The bike was actually designed by a committee of three people: Bob Modero (an engineer at Harley) Jim Haubert (Jim Haubert Engineering) hired as an independent Skunkworks contractor, and Willie G. Although he was not present, this group had a strong styling influence from Dean Wixom when the three decided, as one of the starting points, to enlarge a dirt track XR750 fuel tank. Mr. Wixom was the original designer of this fuel tank.

Changed styling included the addition of a "bikini" fairing, a slim front fender, a reshaped fuel tank, a pillion-free saddle, and a unique "siamesed" two-into-two exhaust. It was "largely ignored" by consumers when launched in the 1970s, and "famously a sales flop", a "narcoleptic turner" due to its long wheelbase and cruiser-like steering geometry, with "lethargic performance", but thirty years later, it had become a collector's item.

Manufacturing numbers:

1977, 1923 pcs at price of US$3595

1978, 1201 pcs at price of US$3623

1979, 9 or 10 pcs remaining parts from stock.

In 2013 a 1977 model sold for 12,000 dollars at an auction. In 2004 a 1978 model went for 9,900 at an auction in New Zealand. In 2010 a 1977 model sold for about US$20,000 by Bonhams at auction.

== Specifications ==
Specs in the infobox are from Motorcyclist.
