= Harley-Davidson XR-750 =

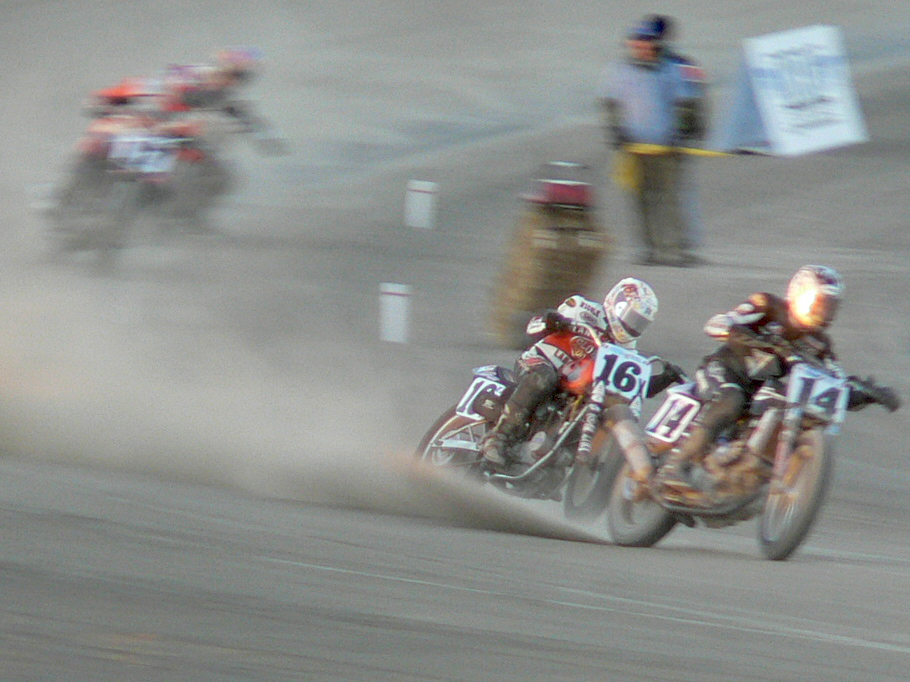
An XR-750, number 16, through the dust at Scioto Downs, Ohio

The Harley-Davidson XR-750 is a racing motorcycle made by Harley-Davidson since 1970, primarily for dirt track racing, but also for road racing in the XRTT variant. The XR-750 was designed in response to a 1969 change in AMA Grand National Championship rules that leveled the playing field for makes other than Harley-Davidson, allowing Japanese and British motorcycles to outperform the previously dominant Harley-Davidson KR race bike. The XR-750 went on to win the most races in the history of American Motorcyclist Association (AMA) racing.

The XR-750 is associated with the careers of racers Mark Brelsford, Cal Rayborn, and Jay Springsteen, and was the favorite motorcycle of stunt performer Evel Knievel. Knievel used the bike from December 1970 until his final jump in January 1977. An XR-750 was included in the 1998 The Art of the Motorcycle exhibition, and one of Knievel's bikes is in the Smithsonian's National Museum of American History America on the Move exhibit.

== Rule changes obsolete KR racers ==
XR-750 dirt tracker
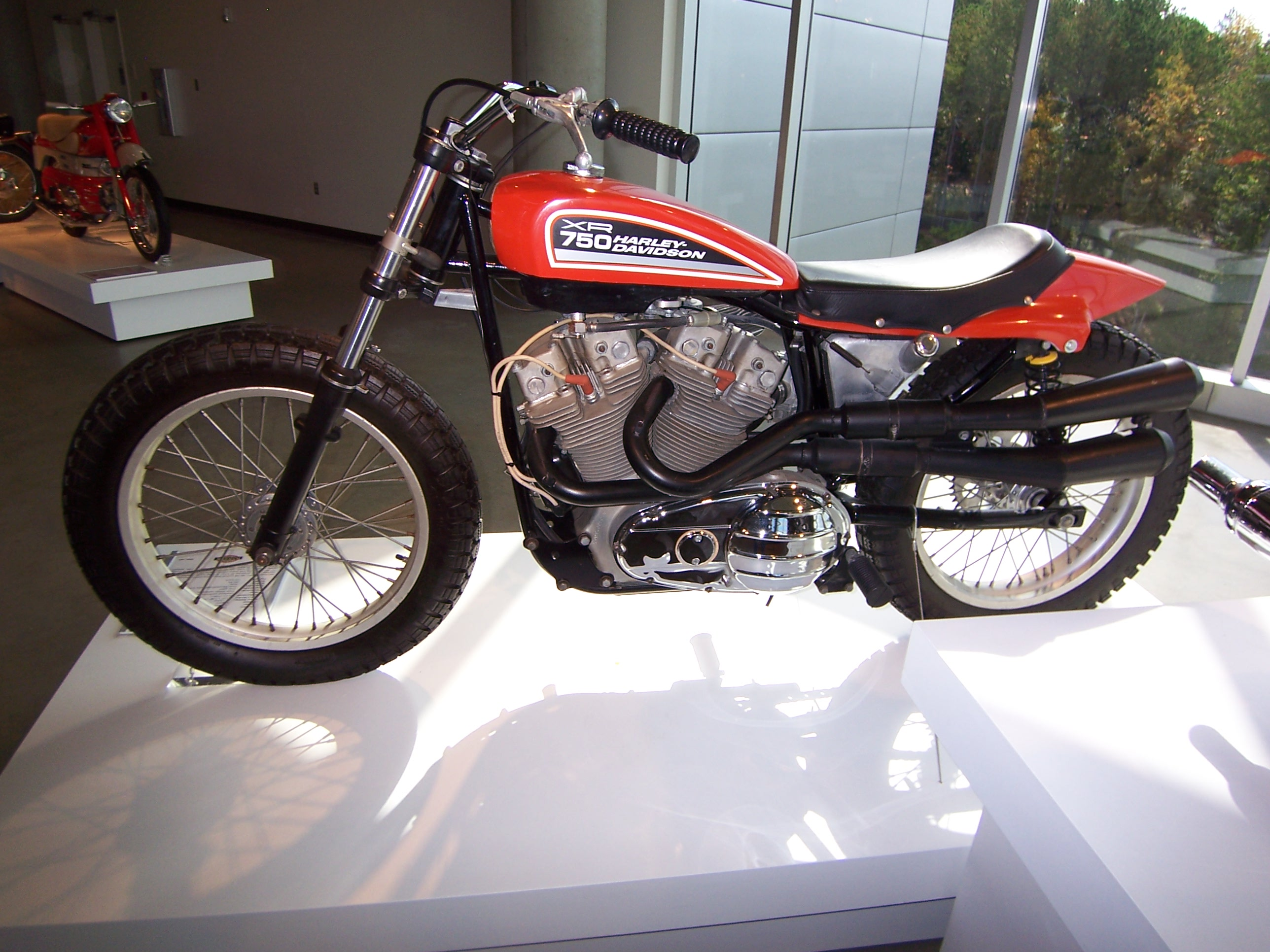
- At the Barber Vintage Motorsports Museum.
- Also called: 70-XR-750
- Predecessor: Model KR
- Class: Dirt track racing
- Engine: 748 cc (45.6 cu in) air cooled V-twin, 2x 36 mm Mikuni carburetors
- Bore / stroke: 76 mm × 81 mm (3.0 in × 3.2 in) (1970 iron head); 79 mm × 76 mm (3.1 in × 3.0 in) (alloy head 1972– )
- Top speed: 115 mph (185 km/h)
- Power: 82 hp (61 kW) @ 7,700 rpm
- Transmission: Triple chain primary, 4-speed, chain final drive
- Frame type: Steel twin loop full cradle
- Suspension: Front: Ceriani telescopic fork Rear: 2x Girling shocks
- Brakes: Front: none Rear: optional
- Tires: Spoked wheels, aluminum rims. 4 in × 19 in (100 mm × 480 mm)
- Rake, trail: 26°, 3.44 in (87 mm)
- Wheelbase: 56.75 in (1,441 mm)
- Seat height: 31 in (790 mm)
- Weight: 295 lb (134 kg) (claimed) (dry)
- Fuel capacity: 2.5 US gal (9.5 L; 2.1 imp gal)
- Oil capacity: 2.75 US qt (2,600 ml)

The AMA Grand National Championship Class C rules, introduced in 1933 and revised in 1954, had an equivalency formula limiting flathead, or sidevalve, engines to 750 cc (46 cu in) displacement, while more modern overhead valve (OHV) engines could be a maximum of only 500 cc (31 cu in). Over time, this displacement advantage kept the older flathead technology on the track and discouraged a broader field of competitors. At least 200 homologated examples of a model had to be built and made available to the public. The flathead Harley-Davidson KR series had dominated Class C racing, but by the late 1960s BSA, Norton and Triumph had little market for 500 cc OHV motorcycles, and there was increasing pressure for a single displacement, without reference to valve configuration. The public was buying 650 cc (40 cu in) and larger displacement British bikes, and they would prove to be competitive, given the chance.

With the British marques gaining influence in the AMA, in 1969 new rules were established that there would be one maximum displacement for dirt track racing, 750 cc, with no regard for valve type, though the 500/750 OHV/sidevalve split was kept for the time being in road racing. OHV engines began to dominate racing, in spite of Mert Lawwill's efforts to delay the inevitable on his flathead Harleys, and the KR bikes were a decade out of date and could no longer compete successfully.

== Development ==
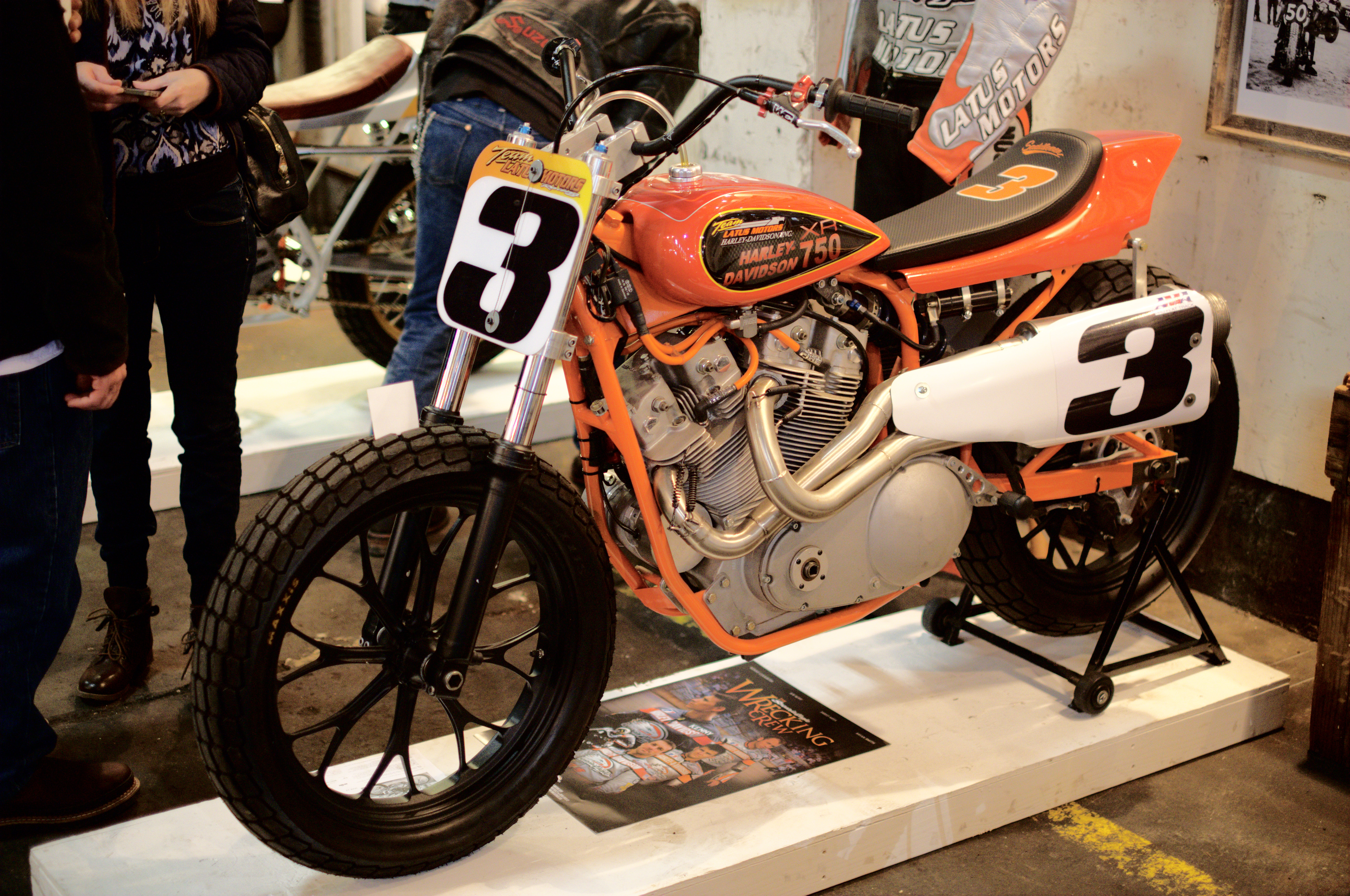
XR-750 c. 2015: Team Latus

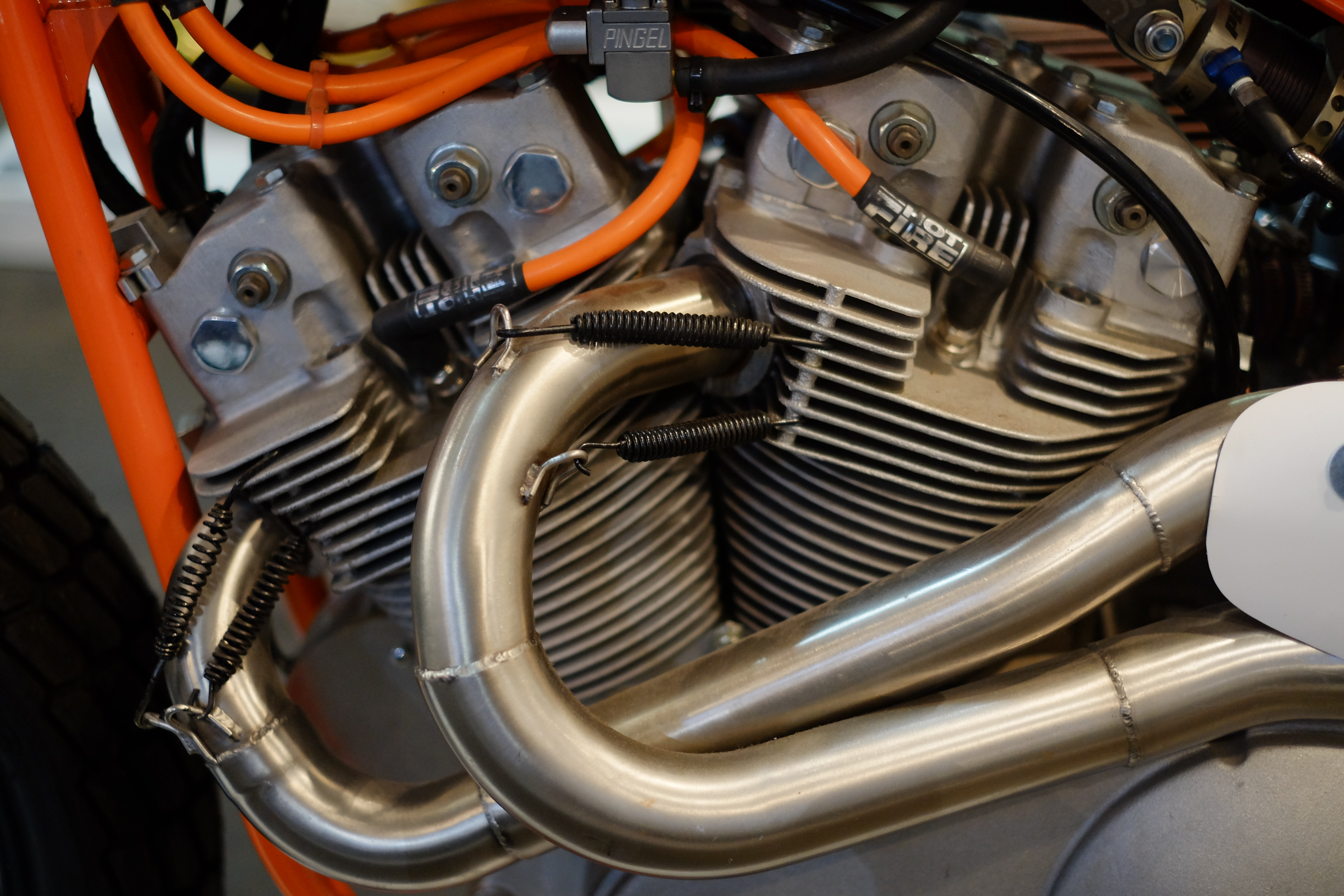
XR-750 c. 2015: Engine left

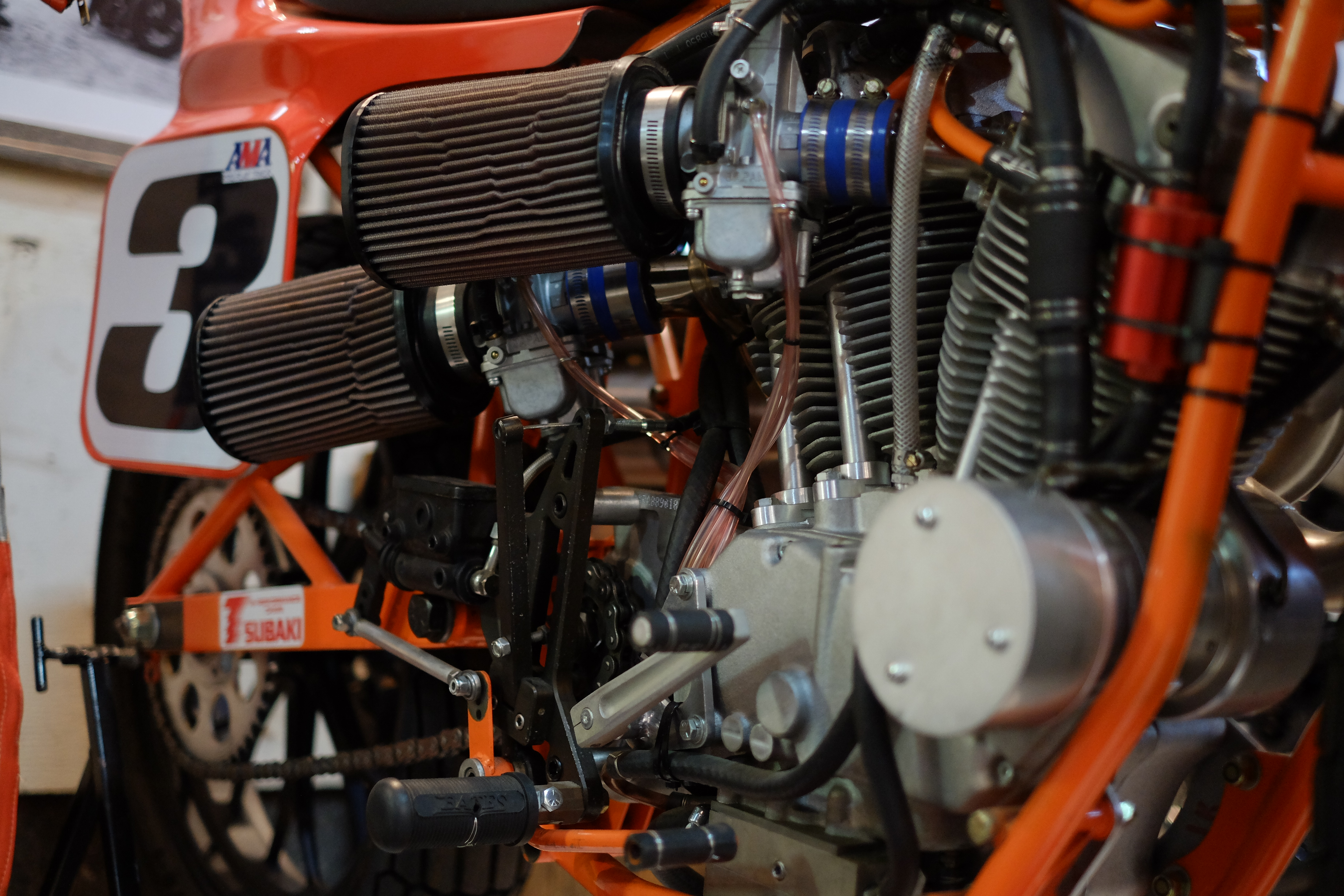
XR-750 c. 2015: Engine right

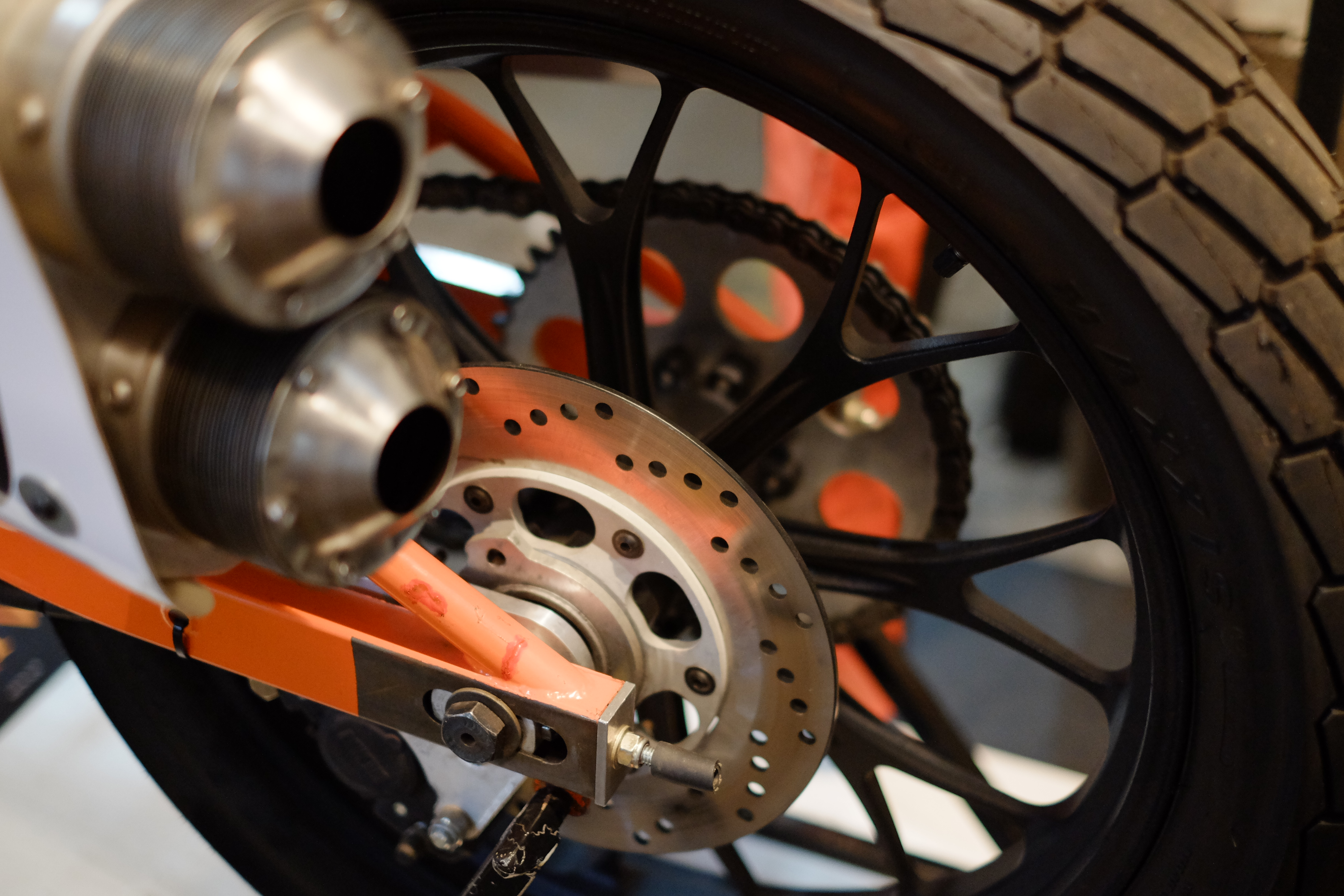
XR-750 c. 2015

With limited time and money in 1969, Harley-Davidson's racing manager Dick O'Brien and his team used elements of existing designs to put together a new OHV racer, but rather than start from scratch they decided to modify their existing OHV racer: the Sportster-based 900 cc (55 cu in) XLR magneto-equipped race engine with a 3.0000 in (7.620 cm) bore and a 3.8125 in (9.684 cm) stroke. It was too large to be legal, so a modified version was created using the same basic upper end parts (iron heads and cylinders) but with a drastically shorter stroke and shorter connecting rods to reduce the displacement to the 750 cc (46 cu in) legal limit.

These iron head XR-750s of 1970–71 were prone to overheating (humorously called "waffle irons") as well as having insufficient power. The engine was again re-designed for 1972 with an all-aluminum head and cylinder package with bigger bore and shorter stroke for the same 750cc displacement. The frame and the running gear were held over from the KRTT racer, with a Ceriani front fork and two Girling rear shocks. The fuel tank, fenders, and rear seat/fender combination were fiberglass, with a snap down seat cover over a foam cushion. To comply with AMA homologation rules, two hundred examples were made and could be had upon request at Harley-Davidson dealers, at a price of US$3,200, which today with inflation would be about US$ 25,910.

Not unlike other Harley-Davidson engines, the unit construction left and right engine cases split vertically, and formed four cavities: a center front crankcase, a center rear gearbox, a right side cavity gearcase for the timing train, where the four camshafts are housed, and a left cavity for the three row primary drive chain. A row of four camshafts had also been used on the KR racers, inherited from the sidevalve Model WL, and even earlier Model D of 1929. While the single camshaft of other Harley-Davidson designs was cheaper to manufacture, and quieter, four cams allowed better performance, such as greater flexibility in adjusting the cam timing, and the short single camshafts are durable, and give the pushrods a straighter path to the rocker arms.

== XRTT road racer ==
XRTT road racer
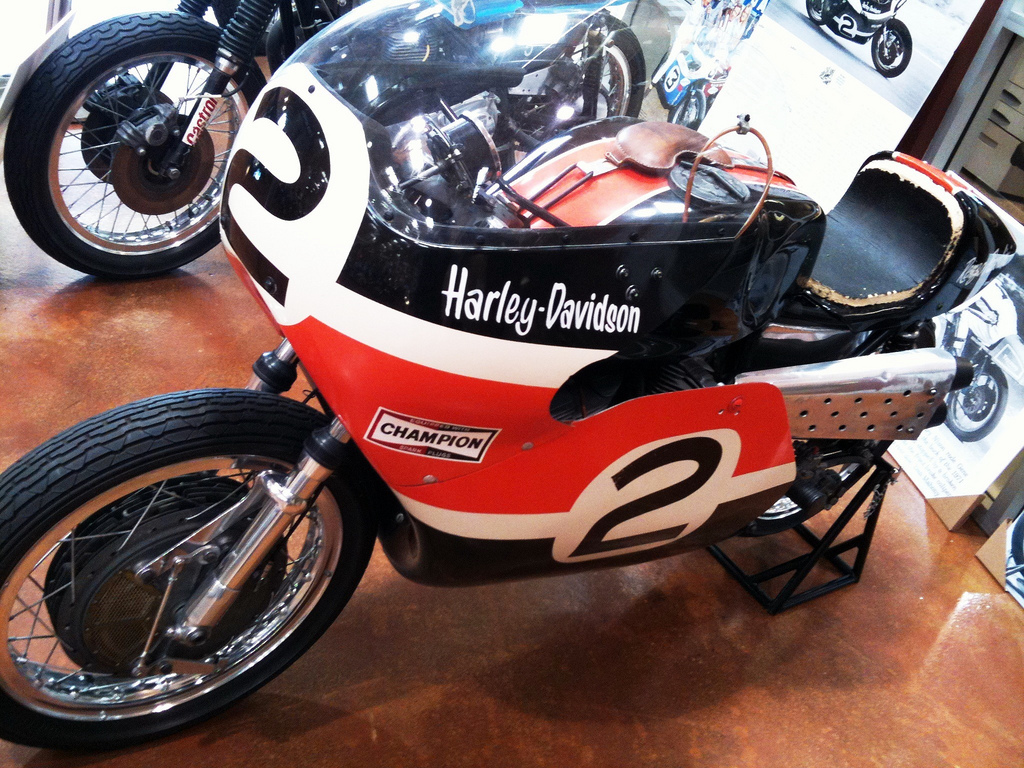
- Also called: XRTT-750
- Predecessor: KRTT
- Class: Road racing
- Engine: 748 cc (45.6 cu in) air cooled V-twin, 2x 36 mm Mikuni carburetors
- Bore / stroke: 79 mm × 76 mm (3.1 in × 3.0 in)
- Power: Est. 70–100 hp (52–75 kW) (early-late)
- Transmission: Triple chain primary, 4-speed, chain final drive
- Frame type: Steel twin loop full cradle
- Suspension: Front: Ceriani telescopic fork Rear: 2x Girling shocks
- Brakes: Front: 4 leading shoe drum Rear: single disc
- Tires: Spoked wheels, aluminum rims. Front: 3 in × 18 in (76 mm × 457 mm); Rear: 3.5 in × 18 in (89 mm × 457 mm)
- Rake, trail: 24°, 3.63 in (92 mm)
- Wheelbase: 54 in (1,400 mm)
- Seat height: 28 in (710 mm)
- Weight: 324 lb (147 kg) (claimed) (dry)
- Fuel capacity: 6 US gal (23 L; 5 imp gal)
- Oil capacity: 4 US qt (3,785 ml)

The road racing version of the XR-750 used an aluminum oil tank, had a 6 US gal (23 L; 5 imp gal) fiberglass fuel tank, and a fiberglass fairing which included extra heat shielding to protect the rider's left leg when riding in a tuck position. On the top center of the fuel tank was a leather pad with a round cutout for the left-side fuel filler cap. Like the dirt tracker, it used a Ceriani fork and Girling shocks, two 36 mm Mikuni carburetors and tuned dual reverse cone exhaust. Instrumentation consisted of a Smiths tachometer.

Unlike the dirt tracker, it came with brakes: a rear disc brake, and in front, a Fontana four leading shoe drum brake, which is two twin leading drum brakes paired side by side in two drums. The XRTT is the final example of a competition motorcycle with drum brakes, superseded by disc brakes on all other racing bikes due to the excessive unsprung weight added by the very large drum brake assembly. The official horsepower was never published, but estimates for the early 1972 engines were in the high 70–79 hp (52–59 kW) range, increasing to an estimated 100 hp (75 kW) or more by 2008.

== Racing ==
Riders on XR-750s have won 29 of the 37 AMA Grand National Championships from 1972 to 2008 inclusive. Besides having more wins than any other bike in AMA racing, it has been called the "most successful race bike of all time", and has a claim to have more wins than any other racing motorcycle in history.

In 1989, Lou Gerencer Sr. built a hillclimbing XR-750 with an extended swingarm that made the bike half again as long. Adapted with mechanical fuel injection and nitrous oxide, Gerencer estimated his engine produced over 150 hp (110 kW). The overstressed engine did not last long, but held together long enough to win the AMA hillclimb championship.

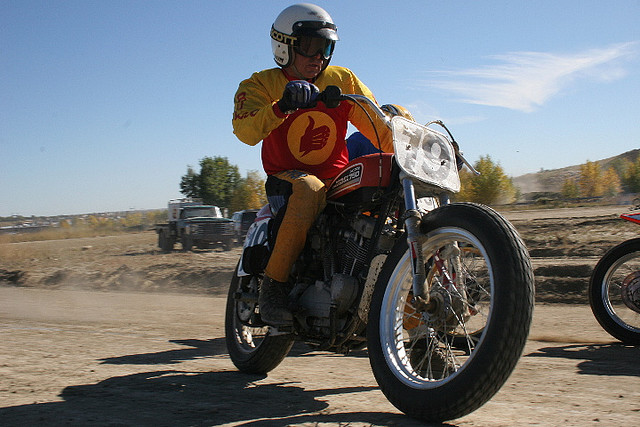

== Street XR ==
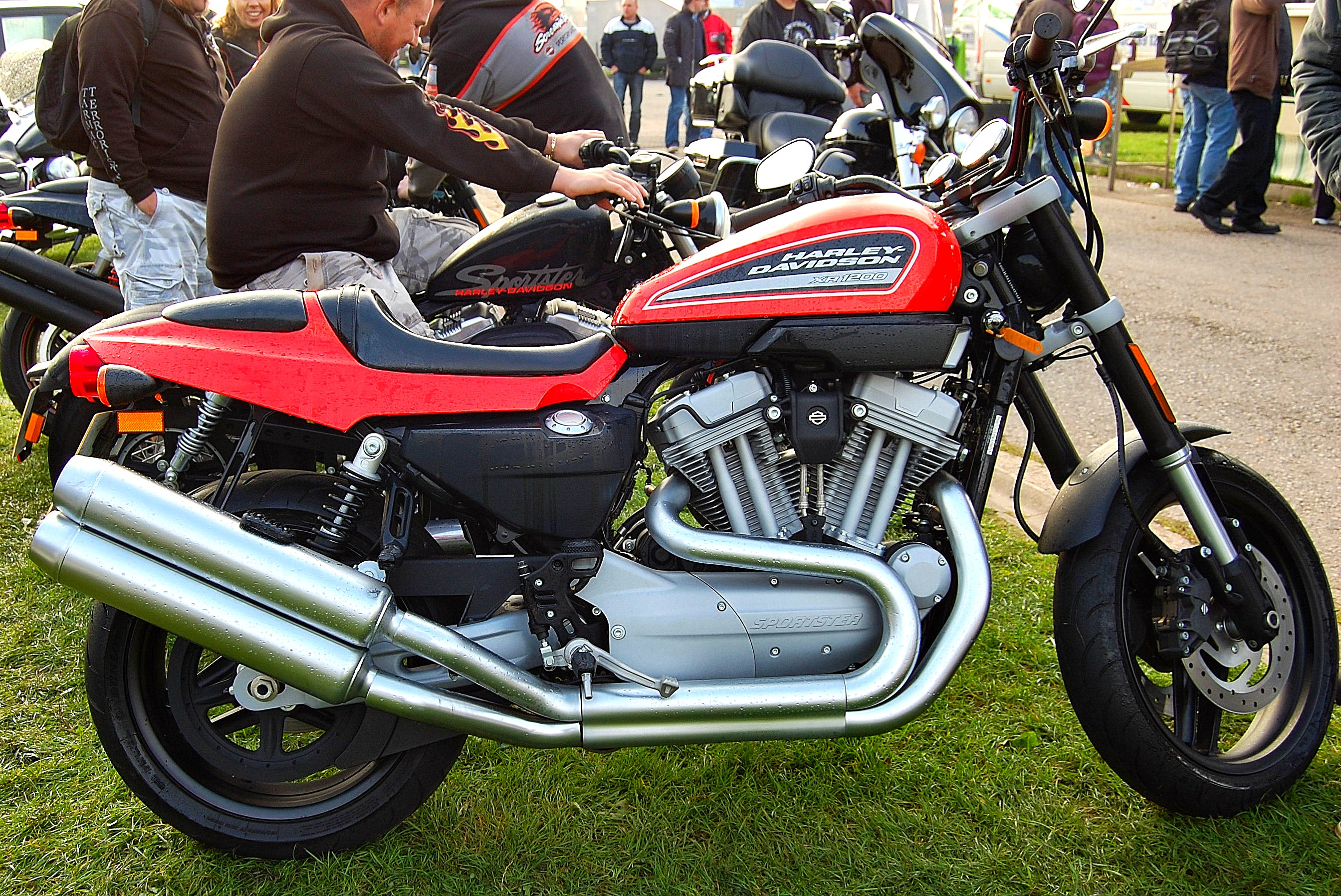
Harley-Davidson XR1200 Sportster

As with the KR, customers began asking for a street-legal XR from its debut. Harley-Davidson was slow to capitalize on this demand, finally introducing the Sportster XR-1000 street bike for the 1983 model year, 13 years after the XR-750 racer. The XR-1000 used XR-750 heads, but kept the Sportster engine, frame and other equipment. Costing nearly twice the price of a base model Sportster XL, the XR-1000 sold poorly and many performance enthusiasts simply bought an XL and upgraded the heads, carburetors and exhaust themselves at significantly less total cost. The XR-1000 was discontinued after only two years, and after another 24 years the Harley-Davidson XR1200 was introduced in 2008 in Europe and 2009 in the US. The XR1200 has less in common with the XR-750 than the XR-1000 did, but has so far found a warmer reception.

Former Harley-Davidson racing team rider, Mert Lawwill, constructs and markets modified Harley-Davidson XR1200 bikes that are street-legal versions of the Harley-Davidson XR-750 that he raced in the Grand National Championship.

== Jumping ==
Evel Knievel began jumping the XR-750 at the height of his career between December 1970 and October 1976 (although a failed practice jump was made in January 1977 and captured on film). Prior to the failed practice jump, Knievel jumped either cars or trucks (or a combination of the two) on the XR-750.

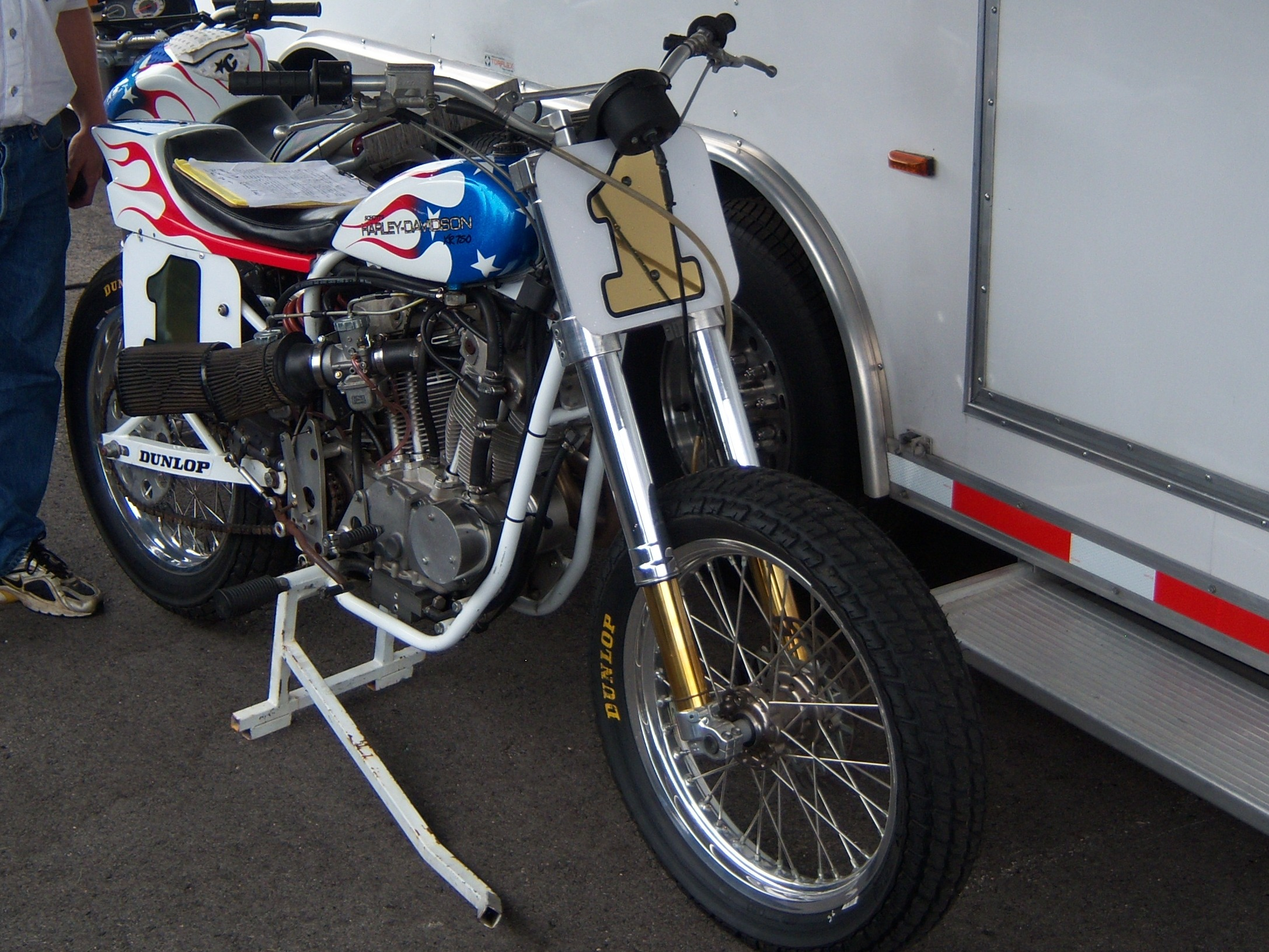
Bubba Blackwell's Harley-Davidson XR-750 jump bike

The longest jump Knievel made over cars was 129 feet over 19 cars in 1971 and was featured in the movie Evel Knievel starring George Hamilton. The longest jump over buses was first attempted with Knievel crashing at Wembley Stadium in 1975 in an attempt to jump 120 feet over 13 buses. Five months later, Knievel jumped the XR-750 over 14 buses for his personal record, and world record for almost 25 years, of 133 feet at Kings Island.

Knievel set most jump records using the XR-750, but since 2008, most jump records are held by stunt performer Bubba Blackwell. Currently, the longest jump on the XR-750 by Bubba Blackwell was successfully made in 1999, when he jumped 15 buses at 157 feet. On August 6, 2015, the daredevil stunt performer Doug Danger at the Sturgis Bike Rally at the Buffalo Chip, broke Knievel's record for most cars jumped on a XR-750 with 22 cars. Knievel attempted this feat of 22 cars in Monroe, Washington on September 1, 1972, and cleared 21 cars but landed on the safety deck covering the 22nd car. Bubba Blackwell attempted the same 22-car jump In 2001 with horrible consequences. He flipped end-over-end when he missed the landing, nearly died and was in a coma for months. Danger accomplished this feat on Evel Knievel's actual vintage 1972 Harley-Davidson XR-750. With no modification to the bike other than relocating foot pegs to accommodate Doug's height.

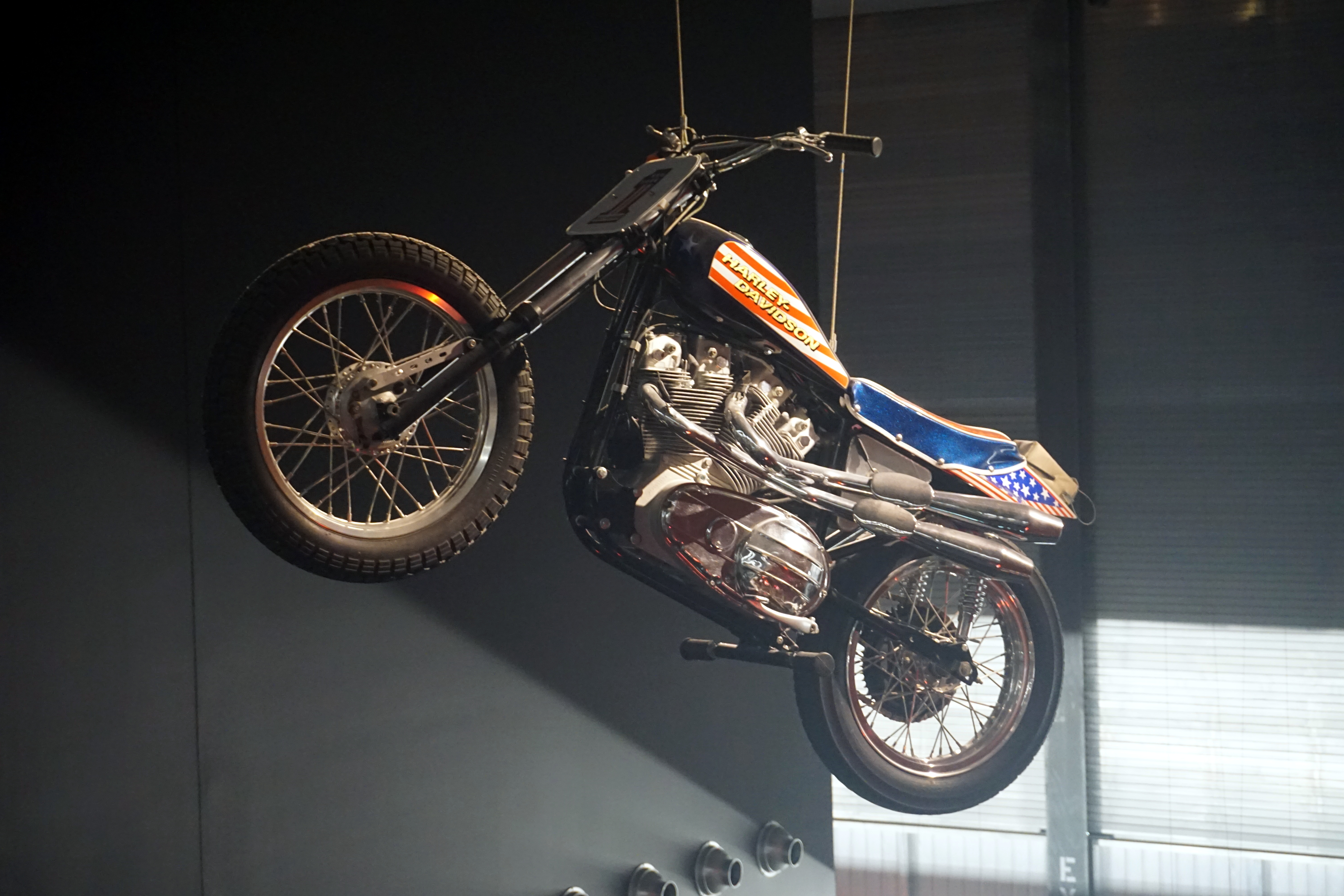
An Evel Knievel XR-750 suspended mid-air as if jumping, at the Harley-Davidson Museum
