= Mert Lawwill =

American motorcycle racer (1940–2026)

Mert Lawwill (September 25, 1940 – May 6, 2026) was an American professional motorcycle racer, race team owner and mountain bike designer. He competed in the AMA Grand National Championship from 1962 to 1977. Lawwill was notable for winning the 1969 AMA Grand National Championship as a member of the Harley-Davidson factory racing team. After his motorcycle racing career, Lawwill became one of the top motorcycle racing frame designers and builders. Lawwill then used his experience as a motorcycle frame builder to become an innovative mountain bike designer, developing one of the first bicycle suspensions. He also developed prosthetic limbs for amputees. Lawwill was inducted in the Mountain Bike Hall of Fame in 1997 and the Motorcycle Hall of Fame in 1998.

== Motorcycle racing career ==
Lawwill was born in Boise, Idaho. He started his racing career as an amateur racer on the local TT track in Boise and, later, scramble races (later known as motocross) across the United States Northwest. In 1961, he moved to Los Angeles, California so that he could race at the Ascot Park race track which, at the time was the epicenter of dirt track racing. He gained sponsorship from Dudley Perkins, a San Francisco Harley-Davidson dealer, to compete in the AMA Grand National Championship which encompassed five distinct forms of competitions including mile dirt track races, half-mile, short-track, TT steeplechase and road races. It was during this time that Lawwill began to learn about modifying motorcycle frames for racing competitions. By 1963, he had become a professional rider and in 1964 he signed a contract to compete for the Harley-Davidson factory racing team with whom he would remain for the rest of his racing career.

Lawwill won his first AMA national race at the Sacramento Mile on September 19, 1965. In 1969, Lawwill won the AMA Grand National Championship and, was voted AMA's Most Popular Rider of the Year. His defense of his Grand National Championship during the 1970 season became the subject of Bruce Brown's 1971 motorcycle documentary film, On Any Sunday co-starring actor Steve McQueen and off-road racer Malcolm Smith. Lawwill continued to compete for the AMA Grand National Championship until 1977 when, he retired at the age of 37 due to an inner-ear disorder that affected his balance. He accumulated 161 career AMA Grand National finishes and won 15 Grand National races during his 15-year racing career.

== Design career ==
In the late 1970s, Lawwill became involved in designing bicycle frames for the burgeoning sport of mountain biking. He was one of the early pioneers in the off-road bicycling world, having introduced the first production mountain bike. He also developed the first commercially produced four-bar linkage suspension for mountain bikes and patented the design. During this period, he continued his involvement in motorcycle racing as a race team owner in the AMA Grand National Championship until 1990 when, he grew frustrated with the way the AMA ran the championship. He then ran the Yeti Cycles racing team competing in downhill mountain bike racing and, developed the successful Lawwill DH-9 full-suspension downhill bike. Lawwill's custom racing bicycles became highly prized by top racers around the world and his designs won numerous national and world titles.

In his later years, Lawwill was involved in constructing and marketing street-legal versions of the Harley-Davidson XR-750 bike that he raced in the Grand National Championship. He also operated a non-profit company supplying prosthetic hands enabling amputees to ride bicycles or motorcycles. Approximately a third of all the prosthetic hands that he manufactured went to the Walter Reed Army Medical Center, for use by military veterans of the Iraq and Afghanistan wars.

== Death ==
Lawwill died in Meridian, Idaho, on May 6, 2026, at the age of 85.
