= Harley-Davidson Sportster =

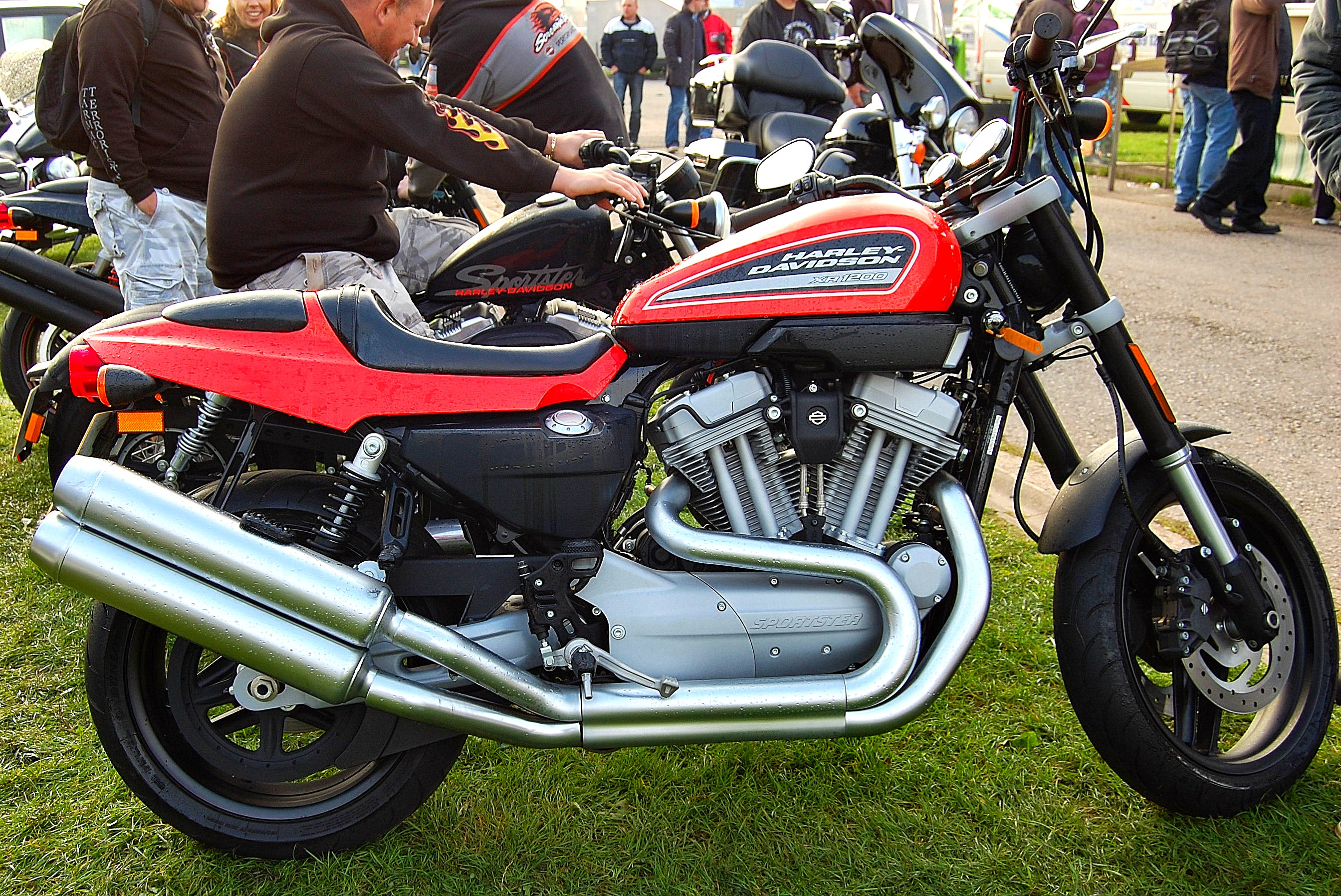
- 2010 XR1200 Sportster
- Manufacturer: Harley-Davidson
- Also called: XL
- Production: 1957–present
- Predecessor: Harley-Davidson KHK

The Harley-Davidson Sportster is a line of motorcycles produced continuously since 1957 by Harley-Davidson. Sportster models are designated in Harley-Davidson's product code by beginning with "XL". In 1952, the predecessors to the Sportster, the Model K Sport and Sport Solo motorcycles, were introduced. These models K, KK, KH, and KHK of 1952 to 1956 had a sidevalve ('flat head') engine, whereas the later XL Sportster models use an overhead valve engine. The first Sportster in 1957 had many of the same features of the KH including the frame, fenders, large gas tank and front suspension.

The original Sportster line was discontinued in Europe in 2020 because the engine failed to meet the stricter Euro 5 emissions standards. An all-new model, called the Sportster S and equipped with the Revolution Max engine, was introduced in 2021. It was the first motorcycle under the Sportster nameplate to receive a new engine since 1986, and the first Sportster to have an engine not derived from the Model K.

== Construction ==
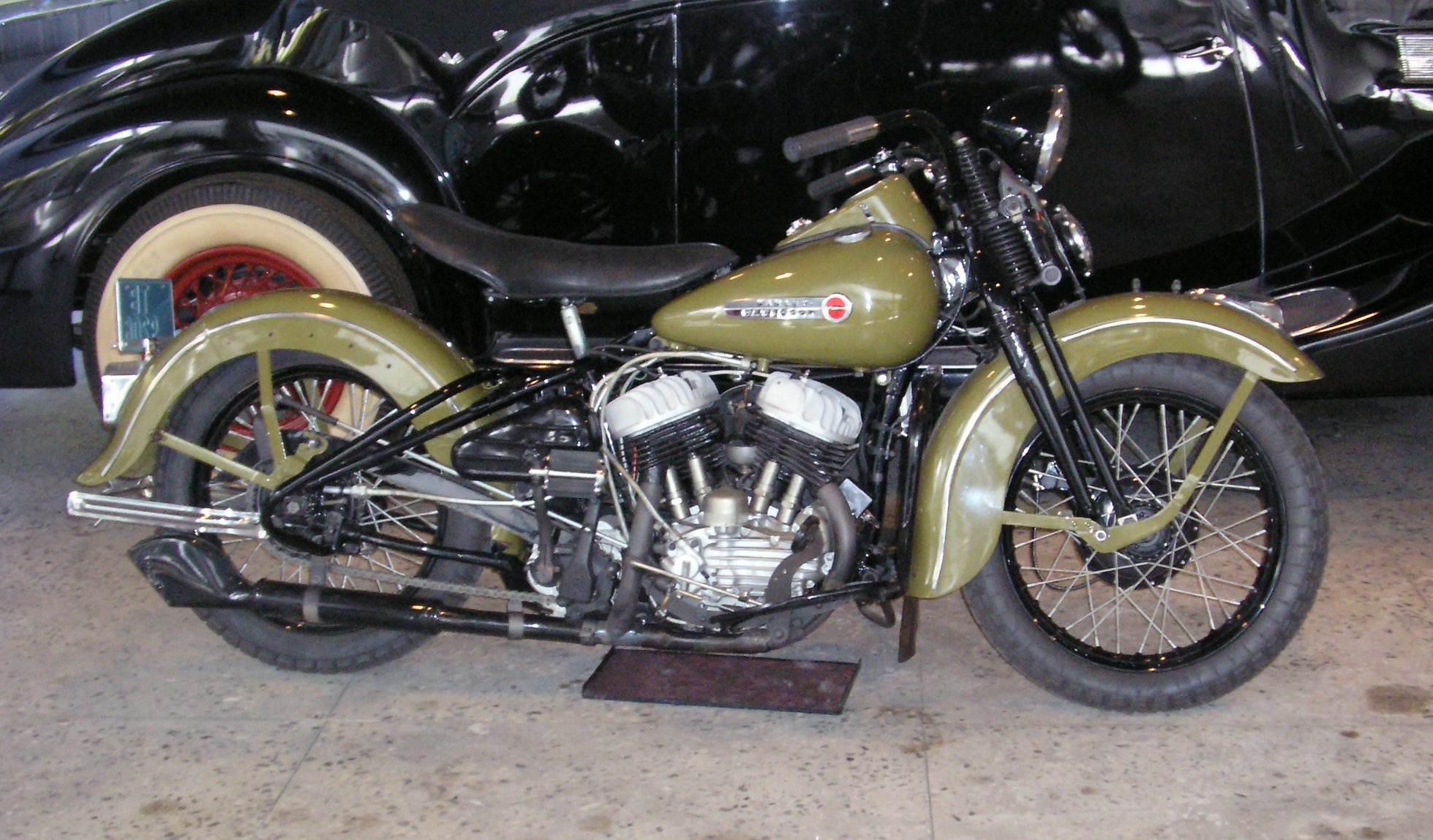
1947 Harley-Davidson mod. WL 739 cc engine

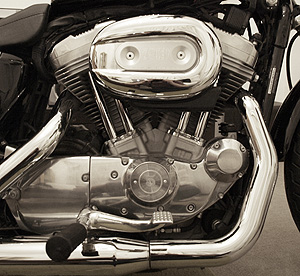
Harley-Davidson 45° V-twin, Sportster Evolution engine

Sportster motorcycles are powered by a four-stroke, 45° V-twin engine in which both connecting rods, of the "fork and blade" or "knife & fork" design, share a common crank pin. The original Sportster engine was the Ironhead engine, which was replaced with the Evolution engine in 1986. Sportster engines, the 45-cubic-inch R, D, G & W Models 1929 side-valve motors, and the 'Big Twin' side-valve motors, which were: the flathead 74.0 cu in (1,213 cc) Models V, VL etc. (1930–1936), Models U and UL (1937–1948), and the 80.0 cu in (1,311 cc) models VH and VLH (1935–1936), models UH and ULH (1937–1941), have four separate cams, sporting one lobe per cam.

The cam followers used in Sportster engines, K models, big twin side-valve models, and the side-valve W model series, were a slightly shorter version of the followers used in the larger motors, but featured the same 0.731-inch (18.6 mm) diameter body and 0.855-inch (21.7 mm) diameter roller follower used since 1929. The company used similar cam followers for decades, with minor changes, from 1929 to the 1980s.

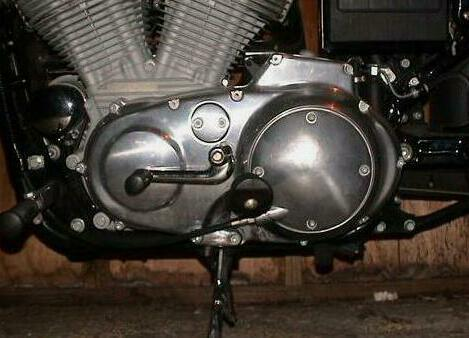
A typical 5-gear, foot-shift transmission on an HD Sportster

Sportster engines retained the K/KH design crankcase design, in which the transmission was contained in the same casting as the engine, and driven by the engine with a triple-row #35 chain primary drive and a multi-plate cable-operated clutch. Models since 1991 have five speeds; 1990 and earlier models had four speeds.

The engine was mounted directly to the frame from 1957 through the 2003 model year. While this system allows the bike to be somewhat lighter with more precise handling, it also transmits engine vibration directly to the rider. In 2003, Harley Davidson produced a limited number of 100th anniversary model Sportsters. They are identified by the 100th anniversary paint schemes and plaques attached to the sheetmetal, speedometer housing, and engine. Sportsters released in 2004 and later use rubber isolation mounts and tie links to limit engine movement to a single plane, which greatly reduces vibration felt by the rider. Buell motorcycles built with variants of the Sportster engine have used a rubber mount system since 1987.

The Model K, from which the Sportster evolved, was the first civilian motorcycle produced by Harley-Davidson with hydraulic shock absorbers on both wheels. Common usage calls this a K Model.

== Model K series ==
This was developed from the earlier 45 W model, but with the revised flat head engine and new 4-speed transmission contained in the same castings as would become the Sportster. The connecting rods would be inherited by the Sportster along with many other design elements and dimensions.

- Model K and KK 1952–1953: 750 cc side-valve engines, using the 45 model bore and stroke of 2.75" x 3.8125" (69.85 x 96.85 mm)
- Model KR (racing only) 1953–1969: 750 cc side-valve engines
- Model KH and KHK 1954–1956: 888 cc side-valve engines, using the 45 model bore, but with the stroke increased to 4.5625" (115.89 mm). This was the only small twin with a stroke longer than 3.8125". The shorter stroke was otherwise universal to the entire 45/K/Sportster line from 1929 to the present (exception: XR750, XB9 Buell).

== XL series Sportsters ==
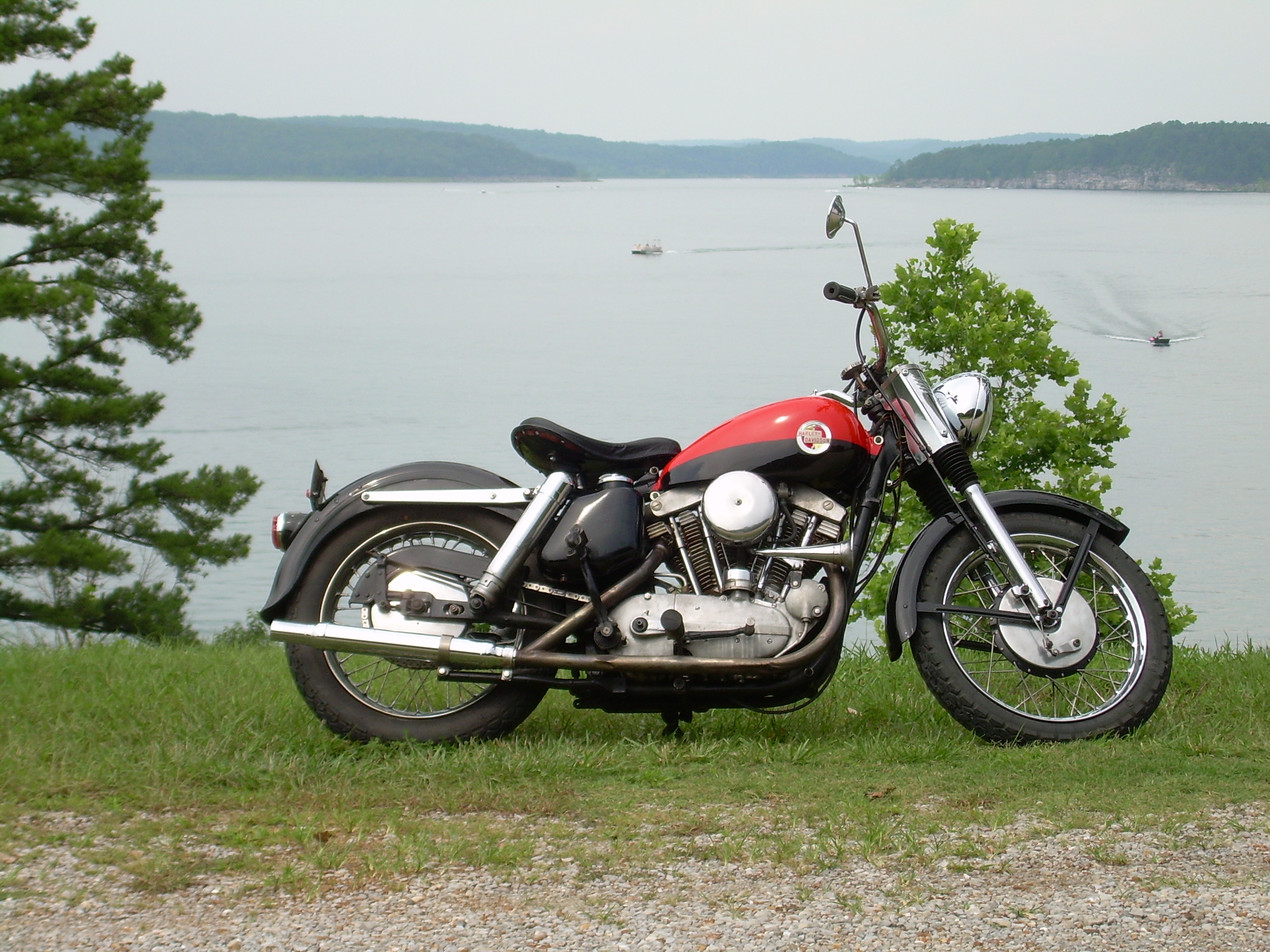
1957 XL

- XL, Ironhead, 1957–1985: 883 cc and 1,000 cc Ironhead overhead-valve engines with cast iron heads, K series frame
- XLCH, Ironhead, (unofficial "Competition Hot" moniker) (unofficial"Xtra Large Charlie Horse" biker moniker)1958–1971: 883 cc, and 1,000 cc 1972 & up
- XR-750 (racing with the exception of being Evel Knievel's jump bike while sponsored by Harley-Davidson between 1970 and 1977) 1970–1971: 750 cc overhead-valve engine, iron heads
- XR-750 (racing only with the exception noted above) 1972–1985: 750 cc overhead-valve engine, alloy heads
- XLCR 1977–1978-1979: Cafe racer 1,000 cc overhead-valve engine, iron heads, 2000 made in 77, 1200 in 78, and 9 in 1979
- XR-1000 1983–1984: 1,000 cc street model using XR racing cylinder head and other XR engine parts
- XLR: 883 cc overhead-valve engines, iron heads
- XLS Roadster 1979-1982 1,000 cc ironhead / 4-speed, stock components—2-inch-longer forks, 2 up seat, sissy bar, highway pegs, 2.2(on 1979) gallon tank
- XLS Roadster, 1983–1985, 1,000 cc ironhead, 4-gallon fuel tank with console
- XL Evolution (also known as the "Evo"), since 1986: 883 cc, 1,100 cc and 1,200 cc Evolution overhead-valve engine, alloy heads

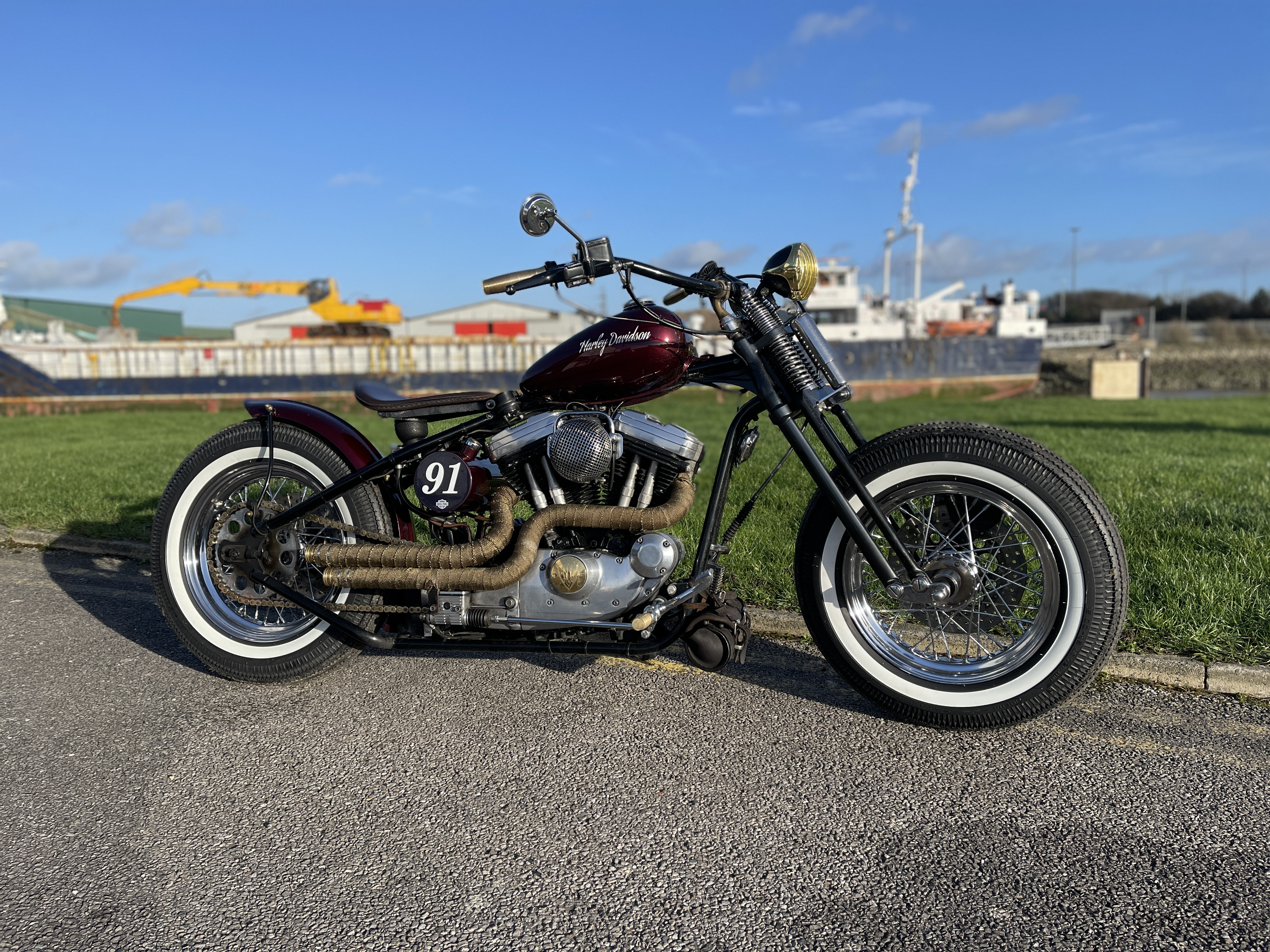
Bobber styled Sportster

== Significant changes by model year ==
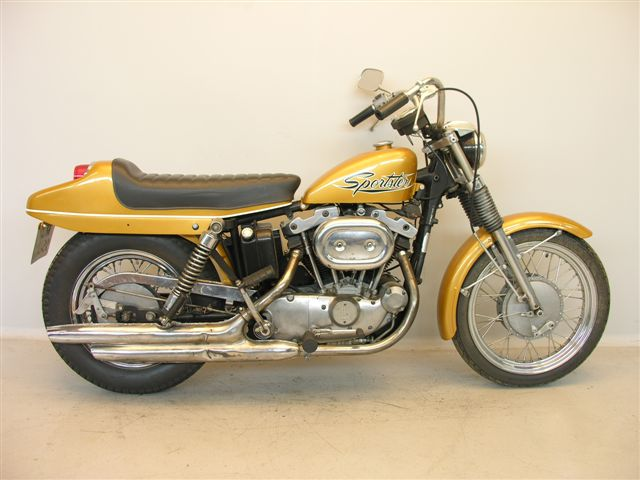
1971 900cc Boattail Sportster XLCH. This bike has Willie G Davidson's designed controversial fiberglass tail section, produced for only two model years.

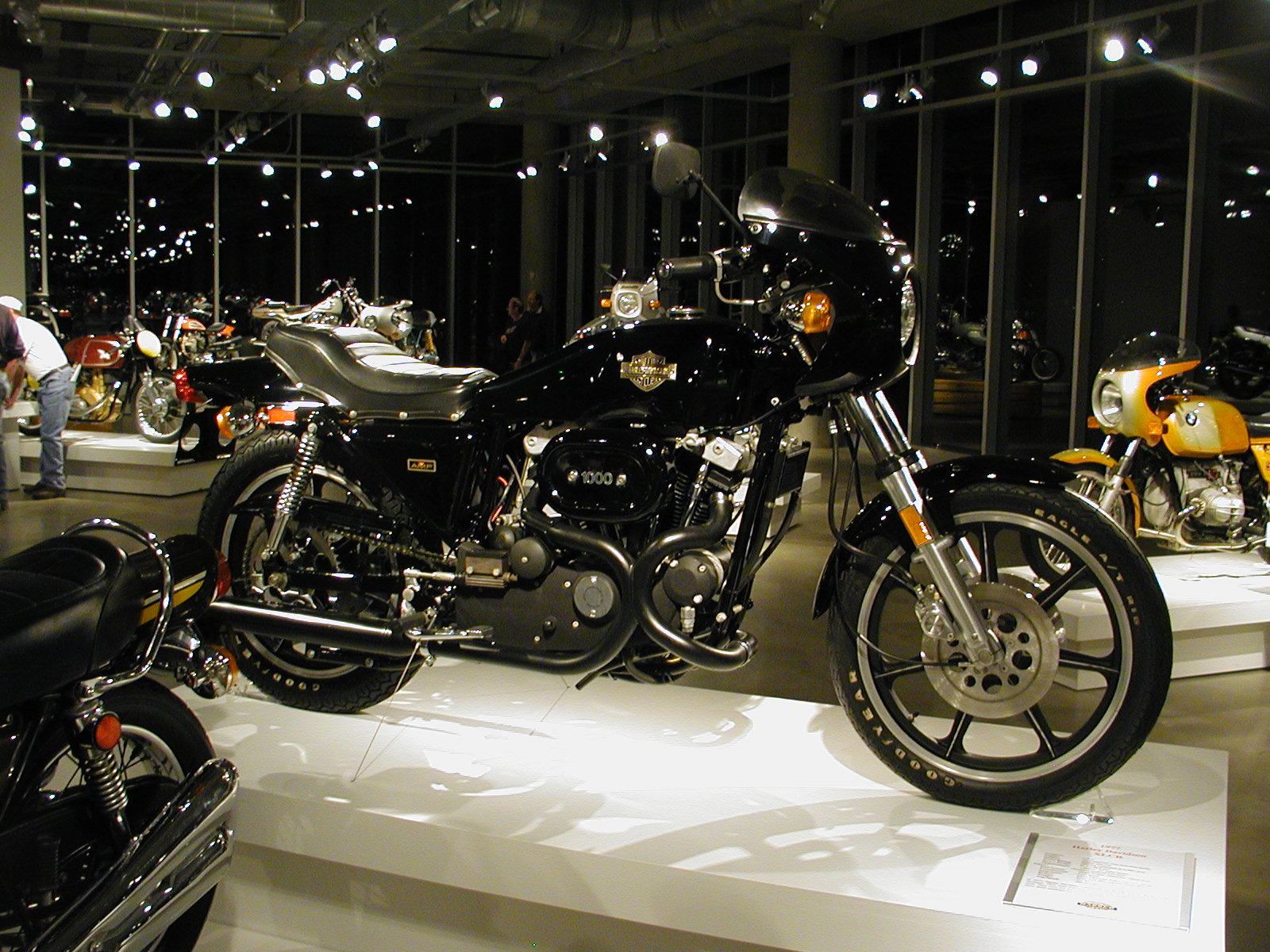
1977 Harley Davidson XLCR

- 1957 "Ironhead" overhead-valve engine introduced.
- 1958 XLH touring high compression model and XLCH sportier "Competition Hot" model introduced.
- 1967 Electric starting introduced on XLH
- 1972 "Ironhead" 1,000 cc overhead-valve engine replaces 900 cc. Claimed power was 61 hp (45 kW) @ 6,200 rpm and a top speed of 116 mph (187 km/h)
- 1975 Switched to left-side gear change (DOT mandate)
- 1977 & 1979 Dual exhaust "Siamese" pipes used, introduced on Willie G. Davidson's XLCR café racer in 1977 all models 1979, along with the triangular frame and rear hydraulic disk brake also introduced on the XLCR. In 1977 a limited edition Confederate Edition Sportster was introduced for one year only.
- 1979 Last year for the kickstart only XLCH, only 141 made.
- 1985 Last year for the "Ironhead" overhead-valve engine.
- 1986 "Evolution" engine introduced in 883 cc and 1,100 cc sizes.
- 1988 1200 cc engine replaces 1,100 cc engine.
- 1988 Constant velocity carburetor replaces butterfly carburetor.
- 1991 Five-speed transmission replaces four-speed.
- 1991 Belt drive replaces chain drive on 883 Deluxe and all 1200 models.
- 1993 Belt drive made standard on all Sportsters.
- 1994 Improved oil tank, battery tray, and clutch made standard.
- 1994 New electrical system with sealed connectors.
- 1995 Electronic speedometer replaces mechanical. XLH1200 Canadian Edition with 1700 units produced.
- 1996 XL1200C Custom and XL1200S Sport models introduced. All 1996 Sportsters feature a new high-contact-ratio gearbox.
- 1998 XL1200S gets dual spark plug heads and high performance cams
- 2000 Introduced sealed wheel bearings and updated four-piston brake calipers.
- 2003 Last year for the frame mounted Evolution engine.
- 2004 All-new frame including rubber-mounted engine for decreased vibration. Elimination of the transmission trap door, New shape hamcan, Exhaust balance pipe moved from running under the air filter and disguised and hidden behind the silencers to show more of engine, new smoother style oil tank right side panel with push and turn filler/dipstick, and the previously exposed battery was now enclosed in a matching side panel on the left
- 2005 Enlarged rear axle to 1 inch (25.4 mm) for increased stability.
- 2006 New XR1200 announced at Intermot in Cologne, Germany. The XR1200 was the first Harley-Davidson to utilize Down Draft DDFI II fuel injection. To be released as a late 2006 model. Introduction of helical gears in transmission (2nd-5th).
- 2007 Fuel injection replaces carburetion on all models.
- 2008 front axle enlarged from 3/4 inch to 25 mm, rear axle decreased from 1 inch (25.4 mm) to 25 mm
- 2009 "One size fits all" front mudguard approach replaced by improved mudguard contour to match each model's respective wheel diameters.
- 2010 The ECU was relocated to allow more variation in aftermarket seat selection. Side-mounted license plate option on some models
- 2014 new electrical harness, new larger brakes, antilock brakes (ABS) option, keyless entry, new speedometer with gear indicator/tachometer, increased engine compression ratio, catalytic converter

== Production and notable Sportster models ==
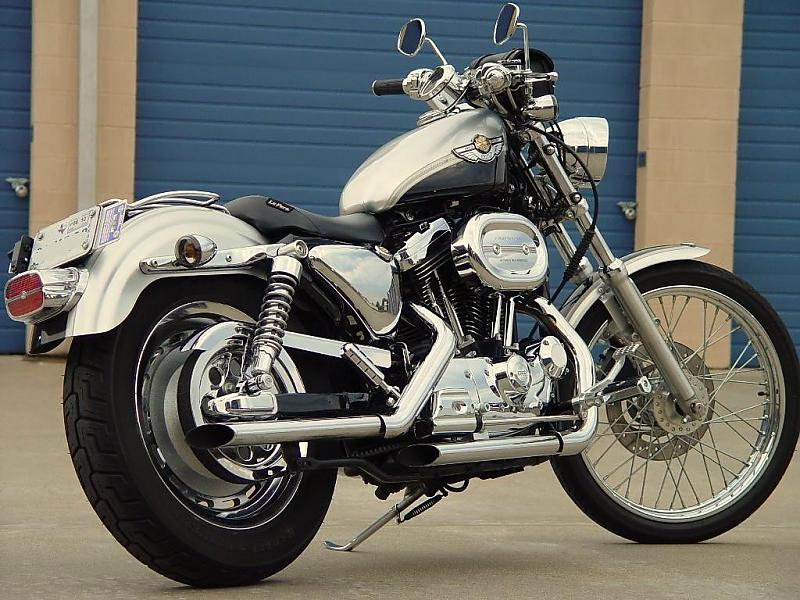
2003 Harley-Davidson XL1200 Custom Anniversary Edition

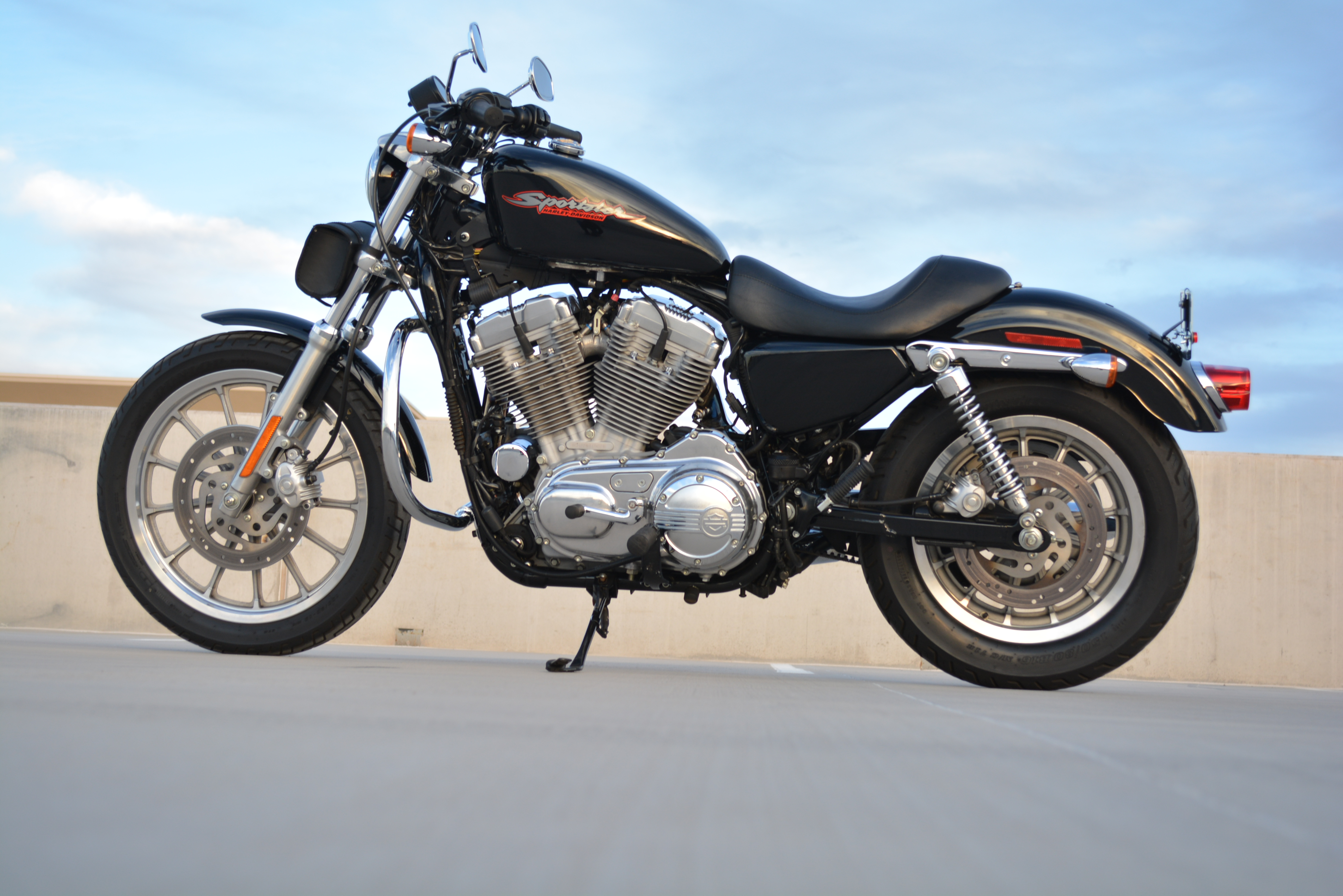
2007 Harley-Davidson Sportster XL883

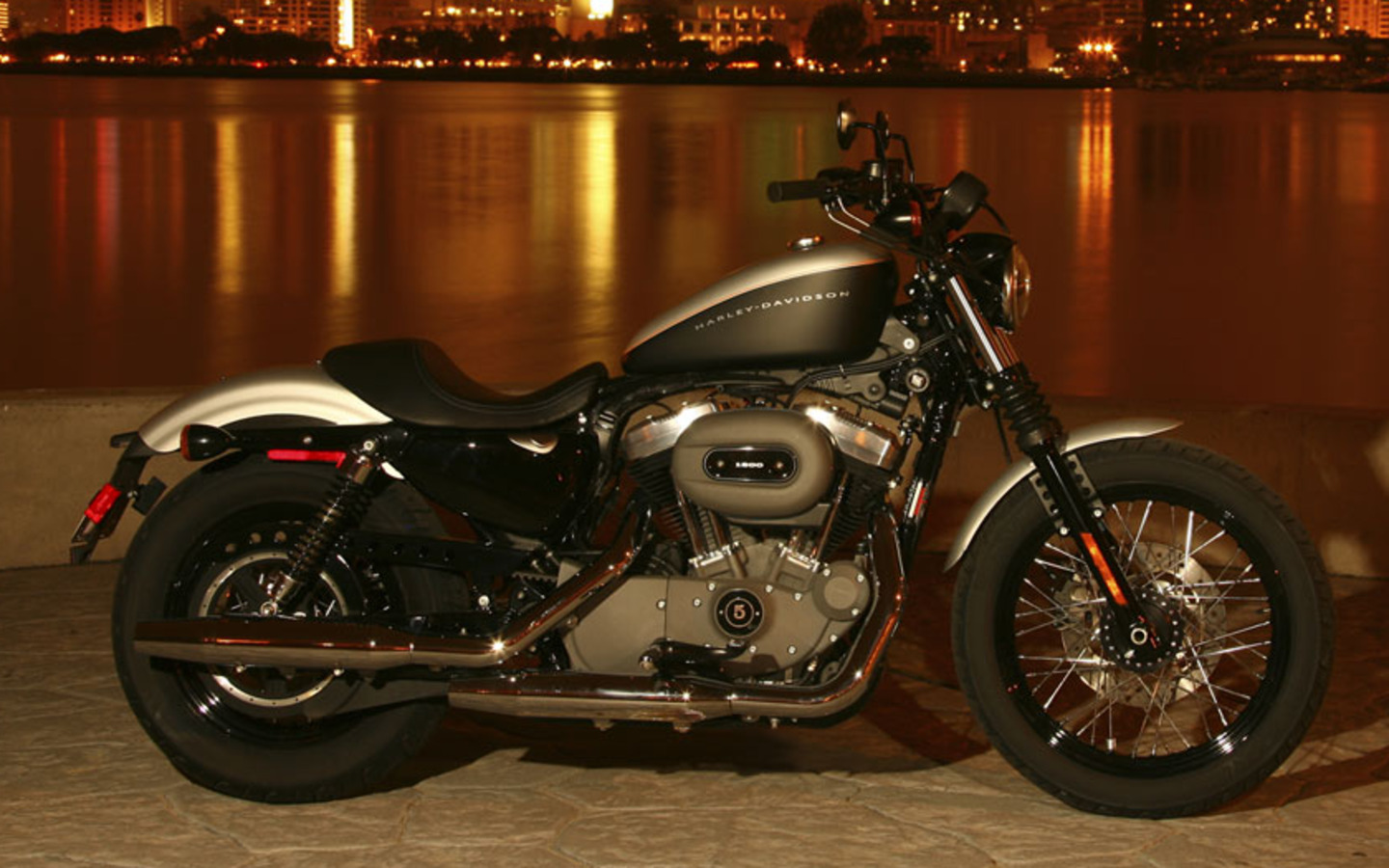
2008 Harley-Davidson Sportster XL1200N

- XLX-61 an entry-level "Ironhead" era Sportster, available with sparse trim, in black with black exhaust and handlebars or red with chrome exhaust and handlebars.
- XLCH, XLH and XT models of the 1977 Harley-Davidson Confederate Edition that had commemorative paint and tank and fender decals. Very low volume production of only 45 XLCH, 229 XLH and 15 XT models.
- XL53C "Custom 53" (EU) XL883C "Custom" (US) '98–'03 (883 cc or 53.9 cu in), Forward-controls, duelseat, solid rear wheel and drag bars mounted on a riser. This became the XL883C "Custom" worldwide with the '04 rubbermount version
- XLH883 "Deluxe", twin seat, tachometer, buckhorn bars, and spoke wheels (vs single seat, speedometer only, low bars and cast wheels for the XLH883 standard model)
- XLH883 "Hugger", with reduced single seat height and reduced suspension, the precursor to the "XL low" models
- XL883 "Sportster 883" single seat standard model, mid-controls, 13-spoke mags or wires
- XL883C "Custom" has wider, flatter "custom" tank, forward-controls, duelseat and 21-inch wire and 16-inch solid disc wheels
- XL883L "Low"; Single seat, very low shocks, mid-controls, 13-spoke mags or wires
- XL883R "Roadster" Frame mount models have a 2–1 exhaust, 13-spoke mags, black engine and are available in orange with 'R' graphics, rubber mounts get 2–2 exhaust, slightly different dualseat, wire wheel option and more 'R' colors, all have triple discs and rev-counter. In 2010, the XL883R officially gets the "Roadster" suffix
- XL883N "Iron 883", blacked-out 883 similar to the Nightster with more black and 13-spoke mags, mid-controls.
- XL883L "SuperLow", new for 2011 has black split 5-spoke mags with polished rims and 120/70-18 and 150/60-17 tires, wider flatter "Custom" tank, mid-controls
- XL900 the original mid compression version
- XLH900 same as the standard XL but with the "H" denoting the high compression engine
- XLC900 off-road version of the XL, The XLC has magneto ignition and kickstart only (as well as several other changes to eliminate weight).
- XLCH900 off-road version of the XLH - or the XLC with the high compression engine! - the "CH" denoting "competition/high-compression". after a year lights, speedo and full road legal specification arrived.
- XLS1000
- XLT1000 "Tourer" 1977 special model had a Superglide tank, screen, bigger seat and panniers
- XLCR1000 "Cafe Racer" model, available in 1977, 1978 and 1979.
- XR1000, two high rise flat track style exhausts on the left and two staggered K&N type filters feeding Dell'Orto carburetors on the right. Had a 1,000 cc engine and a combination of XLX Sportster and modified XR-750 parts.
- XLH1100
- XLH1200
- XL1200C "Custom" Frame mount models had a chunkier dual seat and normal tank, rubber mounts get smoother seat and flatter wider "custom" tank, all have 21-inch wire and 16-inch slotted disc wheels and forward-controls
- XL1200L "Low"; Dualseat, mid shocks, mid-controls, wider flatter "Custom" tank, 13-spoke mags or wires
- XL1200S "Sport" – The XL 1200S was an all new model in the Sportster family starting in 1996. The first road-going Harley to be factory equipped with full-on adjustable sporting suspension, adjustable in compression, rebound and preload. The 1200 Sport features many other enhancements not found on the likes of any other Harley-Davidson. Items such as new 13-spoke cast aluminum wheels mounted with Dunlop K591 Sport Elite tires, flat, sport-styled handlebars, sport-styled seat with textured insert and embroidered Sportster logo, larger 3.3 gallon fuel tank, and dual front, floating-disc brakes, custom turn signals, and a 9.5:1 compression ratio. There were a total of 4151 1996 Sport models built with only 653 in Patriot Pearl Red. 1998 to 2003 model years get less restrictive mufflers, special camshaft profiles, dual plug cylinder heads with single fire ignition and a 10:1 compression ratio.
- XL1200R "Roadster" Black engine with highlighted fins, triple discs, rev-counter, orange paint available but no 'R' graphics and '08 models get the wider flatter "custom" tank which distance it further from the 883R
- XL50 1200 "50th Anniversary" 2007 limited production of 2,000 models
- XL1200N "Nightster" first of the Dark Customs, combined LED tail/brake/indicator lights, tapered silencers (EU) and side-mounted LED-lit licence plate, 11-inch shocks, and baloney cut silencers (US), mid-controls and wire wheels
- XR1200 More sports orientated "Euro"-style bike, inverted forks, reworked Sportster engine with XR heads, new chassis, four-pot double discs, 120/70-18 and 180/55-17 split 3-spoke mags, rear-controls - has its own race series
- XL1200X "Forty-Eight", in the "Dark" Nightster style but has the classic 1948 style small peanut tank, wire wheels, forward controls, a whole new 130 mm front tire, and super small single seat
- XR1200X Starting as a XR1200 with piggyback/fully adjustable shocks, fully adjustable front end, available in either Black Denim or White Denim paint colors
- XL1200C "1200 Custom" As of 2011 has a 130/90B16 front tyre, wide front end, 5-spoke mags (UK gets wires), new shape eyebrow, wider flatter "Custom" tank and introduces "H-D1".
- XL1200V "72" Radical Chopper with design inspired by the classic styling of the early 1970s chopper/bobbers that were prevalent during this time. Bike has the chopper bobber look, Hard Candy Custom (with metal flake) paint was optional.

=== Nightster ===
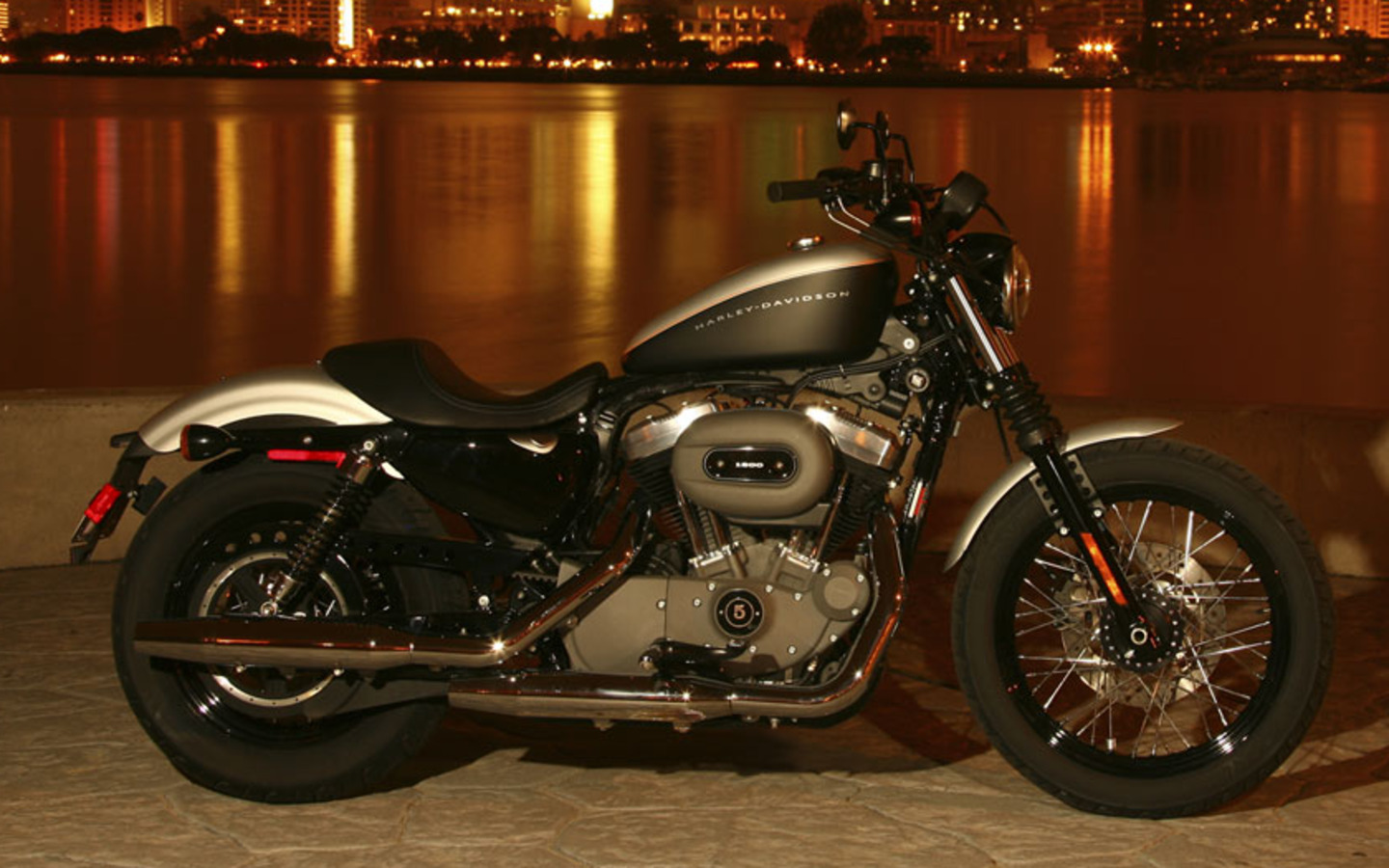
2008 XL1200N Nightster

Introduced in 2007, the XL1200N Nightster included (then) unique elements such as a bobbed rear fender, front fork gaiters, and a side mount license plate. The riding position and 25.3-inch (640 mm) seat height of the Nightster are the same as those of the XL883L Sportster Low - UK version (along with Iron 883 and Forty-Eight) has central number plate, 13.5-inch rear shocks, tapered silencers, and combined LED indicator/tail/brake lights. The bike has a measured HP of 57.2 hp (42.7 kW) (rear wheel) and 64.4 lb⋅ft (87.3 N⋅m) (rear wheel) and a top speed of 107 mph (172 km/h) and a wet weight of 564 lb (256 kg).

The Harley "Iron" was introduced in 2009 as a smaller-displacement version of the Nightster. The major differences are blacked-out engine, cast wheels instead of laced; narrower handlebars; and of course the smaller 883 cc engine displacement compared to the Nightster's 1200 cc. The Nightster was discontinued in 2012.

The Nightster name returned in 2022 with a 975cc engine.

=== XR1200 ===
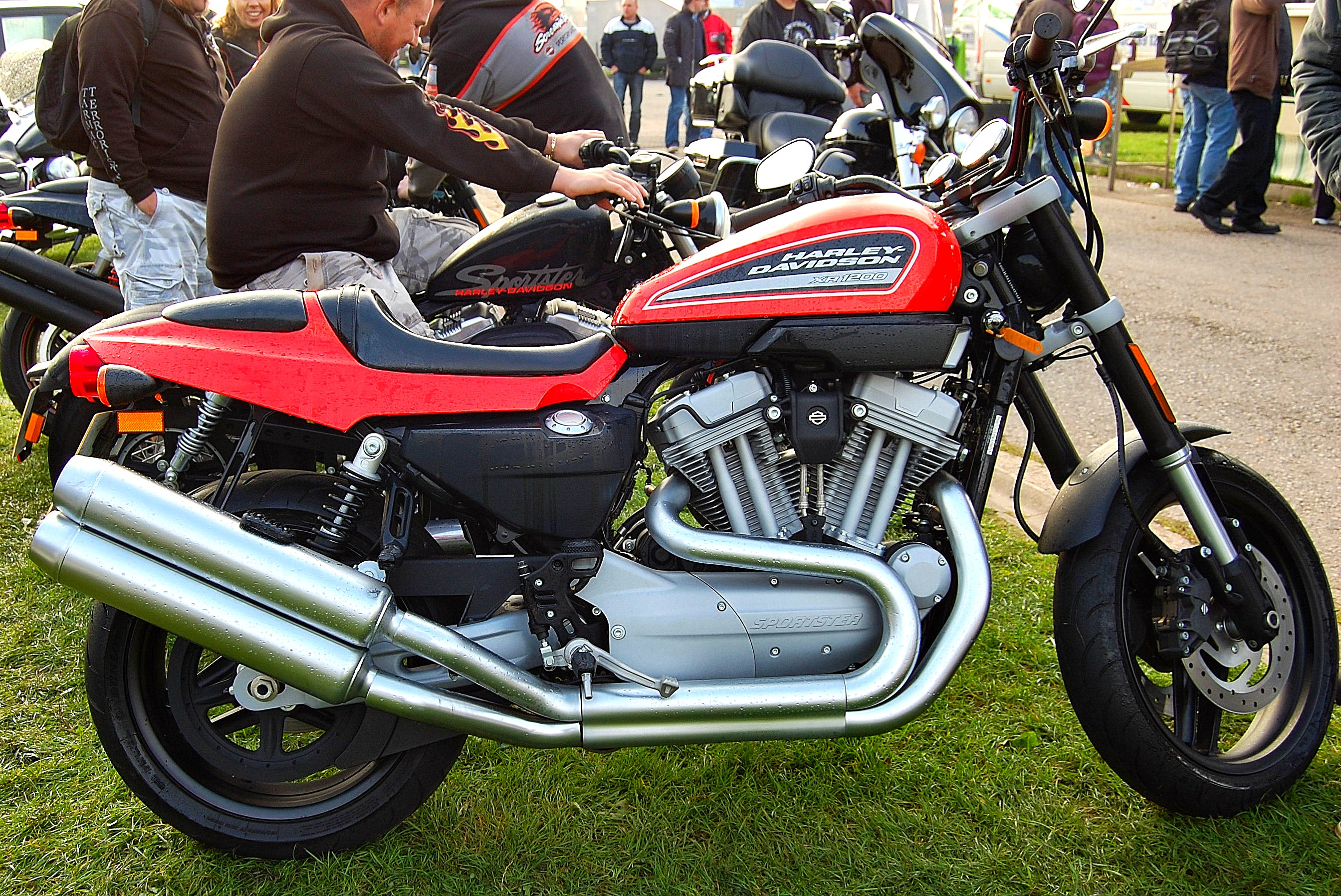
2010 Harley-Davidson XR1200 Sportster

In the 2008 model year, Harley-Davidson released the XR1200 Sportster in Europe, Africa, and the Middle East. The XR1200 had an Evolution engine tuned to produce 91 bhp (68 kW), four-piston dual front disc brakes, and an aluminum swing arm. Motorcyclist had the XR1200 on the cover of its July 2008 issue, and was generally positive about it in their "First Ride" story, in which Harley-Davidson was repeatedly asked to sell it in the United States. One possible reason for the delayed availability in the United States was the fact that Harley-Davidson had to obtain the "XR1200" naming rights from Storz Performance, a Harley customizing shop in Ventura, California. The XR1200 was released in the United States in 2009, in a special color scheme including Mirage Orange highlighting its dirt-tracker heritage. The first 750 XR1200 models in 2009 were pre-ordered and came with a number 1 tag for the front of the bike, autographed by Kenny Coolbeth and Scott Parker and a thank you/welcome letter from Harley-Davidson, signed by Bill Davidson. The XR1200 was discontinued on the United States Market after 2012. For 2012, the XR1200X model had upgraded suspension front and rear. The bike has a measured HP of 79.26 hp (59.10 kW) (rear wheel) and 67.53 lb⋅ft (91.56 N⋅m) (rear wheel) and a top speed of 120.7 mph (194.2 km/h)and a wet weight of 580 lb (260 kg).

=== Forty-Eight ===
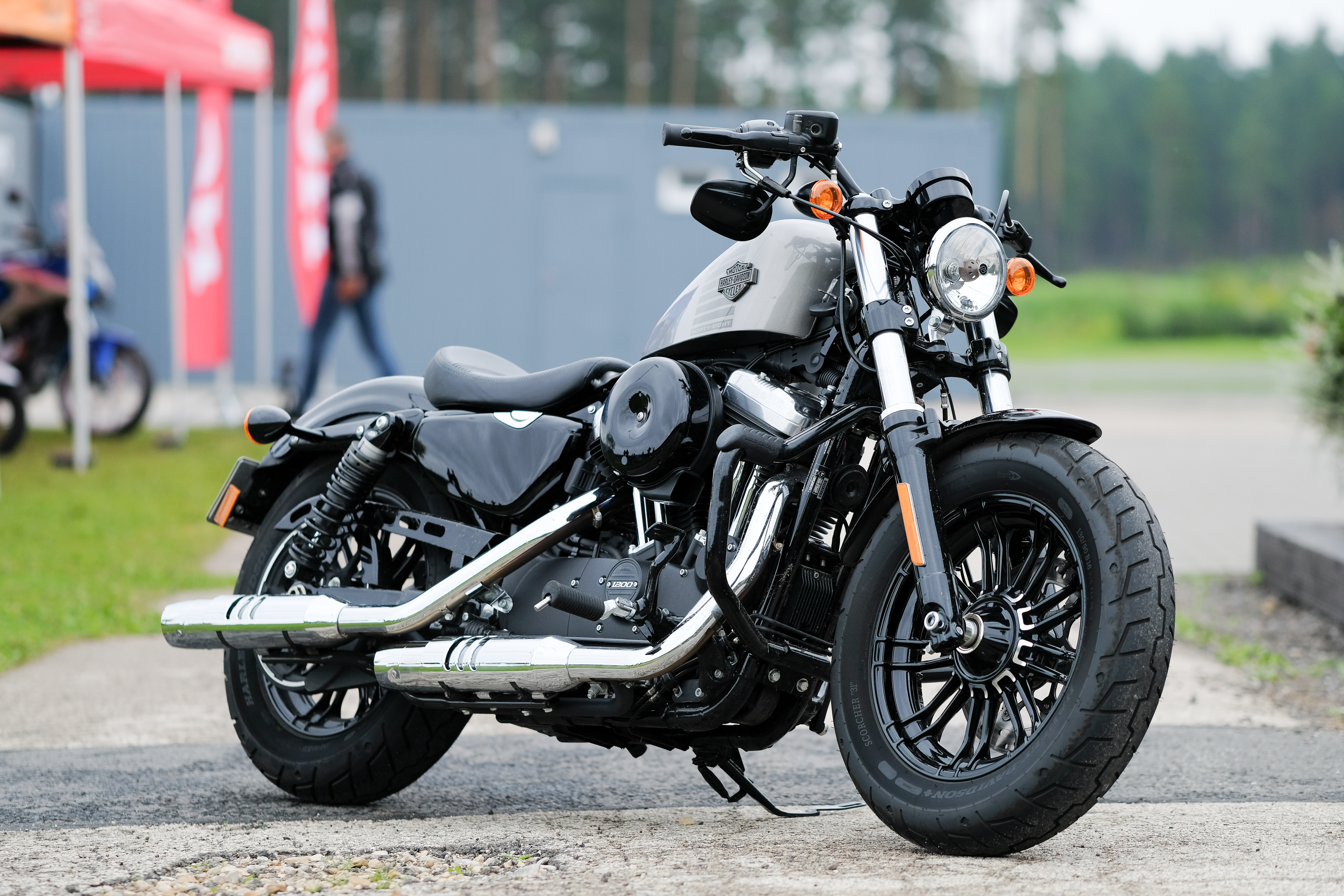
Harley-Davidson Sportster Forty-Eight

In the 2010 model year, Harley-Davidson introduced the XL1200X "Forty-Eight" model. It was similar to the "Dark" Nightster style but has the classic 1948 style small peanut tank, wire wheels, forward-controls, a wider front tire with a fat front end and chopped front fender, a slammed speedo with under mount mirrors, low solo single seat, and low suspension.

=== Seventy-Two ===
In the 2012 model year, Harley-Davidson introduced the XL1200V "Seventy-Two" model, sold until 2016. It has the classic styling of the early '70s chopper/bobbers that were prevalent during this time. It has the peanut gas tank, wire wheels, white-wall tires, forward-controls, a bit of extra rake and slightly longer front forks, a chopped (bobbed) rear fender, side-mounted license plate, low solo single seat, mini-ape hanger handlebars, and low suspension. The bike has a measured HP of 54.67 hp (40.77 kW) (rear wheel) and 59.81 lb⋅ft (81.09 N⋅m) (rear wheel) and a top speed of 108 mph (174 km/h) with a wet weight of 559.5 lb (253.8 kg).

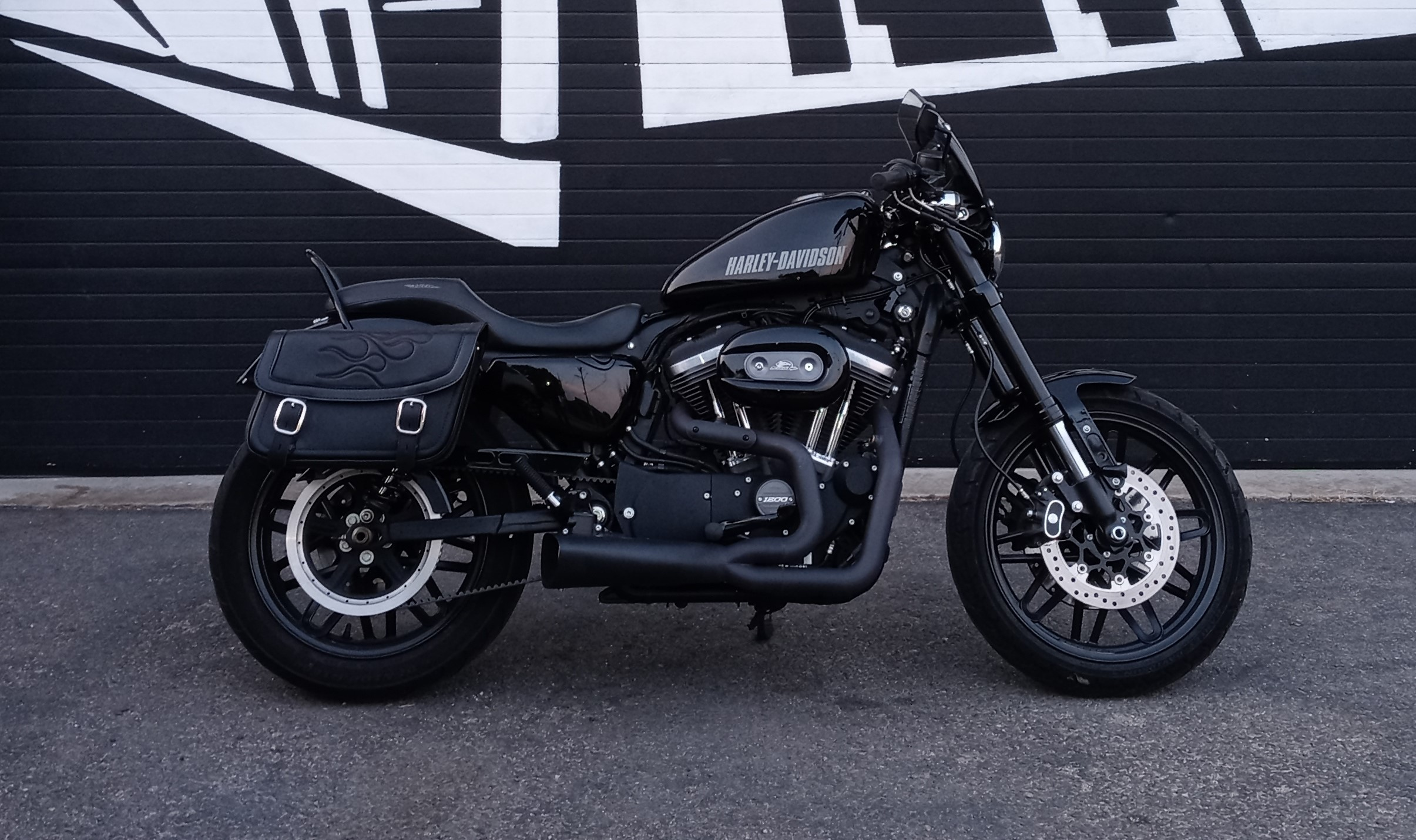
2016-HD-Roadster

=== Roadster ===
In the 2016 model year, Harley-Davidson introduced the XL1200CX "Roadster" model. This was the sporty Sportster with café bike styling and stance. With mid-position pegs and a slammed drag bar give a slight lean-forward riding position. A 43mm inverted cartridge fork and in the back preload-adjustable emulsion-type shocks help the roadster to have the greatest lean angle of any Sportster. Also standard are twin 300mm floating disc brakes and a tachometer. The bike has a measured HP of 65.4 hp (48.8 kW) (rear wheel) and 69.7 lb⋅ft (94.5 N⋅m) (rear wheel).

== Current models ==
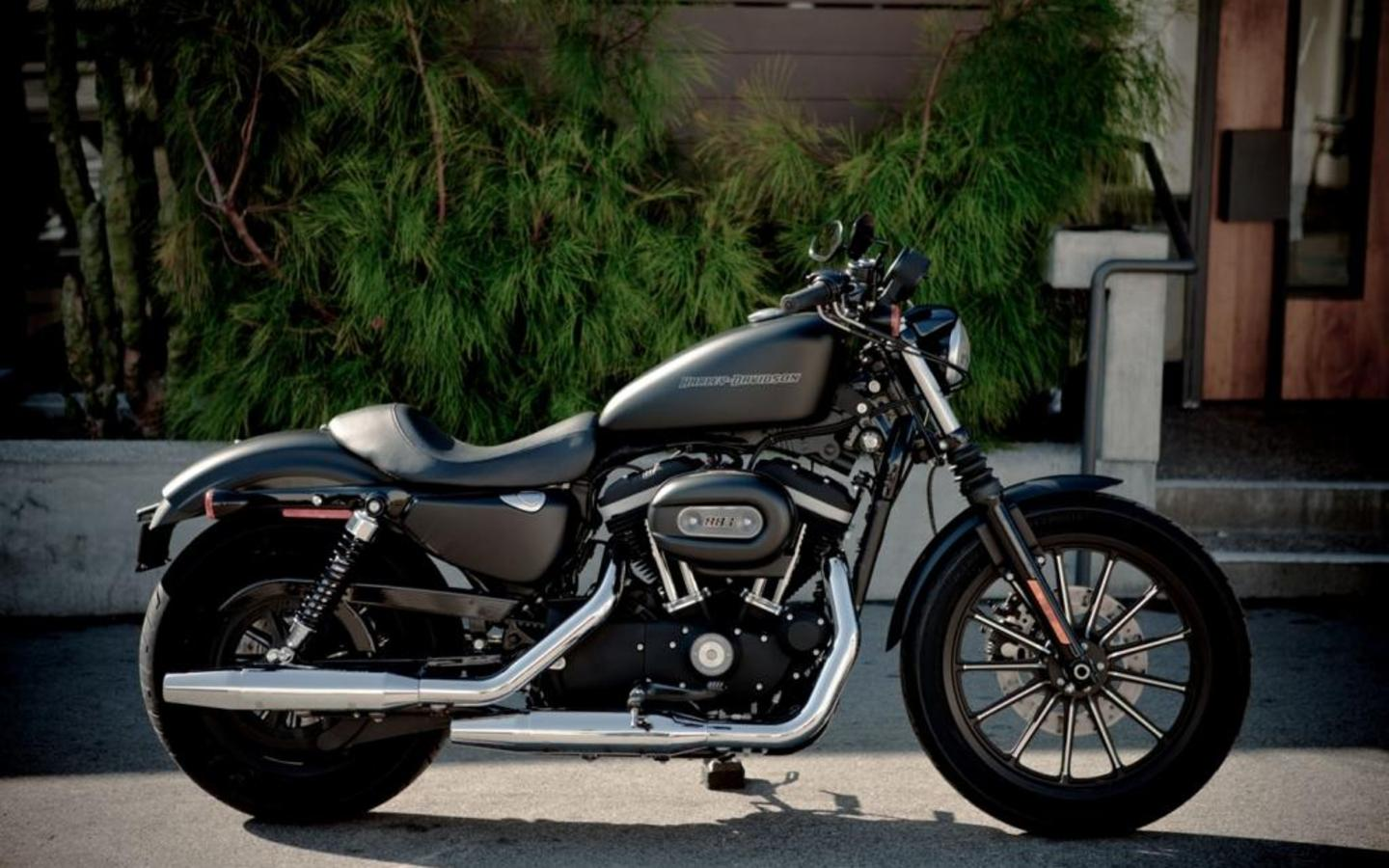
Harley-Davidson Sportster Iron 883

The Sportster was offered in a number of different models. The 2024 models, which are not all offered in the same countries, are:

- Iron 883 - XL883N
- Iron 1200 - XL1200NS
- Forty-Eight - XL1200X
- Sportster S (launched in 2021)
- Nightster

Harley-Davidson manufactured the last Evolution Sportster, a Gunship Gray 883, on November 18, 2022.

== Sportster S and Nightster ==
In 2021, Harley-Davidson launched the completely redesigned Sportster S with the new Revolution Max 1250T stressed member engine and described it as a "sports custom motorcycle". In an independent review, UK publisher Bennetts commented that: "Despite the Sportster moniker, the new bike’s specs mean it’s got more in common with the old V-Rod than its namesakes. By the end of its life, the V-Rod had a 1247cc, water-cooled, DOHC V-twin making 125hp, putting it within spitting distance of the new Sportster’s 1252cc and 121hp. But the old bike was a much heftier machine, coming in at around 300kg depending on which version you picked, where the Sportster S is a relatively lithe 228kg ready-to-ride. The result means the Sportster will be a significantly better-performing machine, both in a straight line and around corners, than the old V-Rod." The Sportster S was soon followed by the Nightster and Nightster Special, both powered by the new and smaller Revolution™ Max 975T engine (90 HP at 7,500 RPM and 70 LB-FT at 5,000 RPM) with 2-into-1 exhaust at a lower price point.

== Buell ==
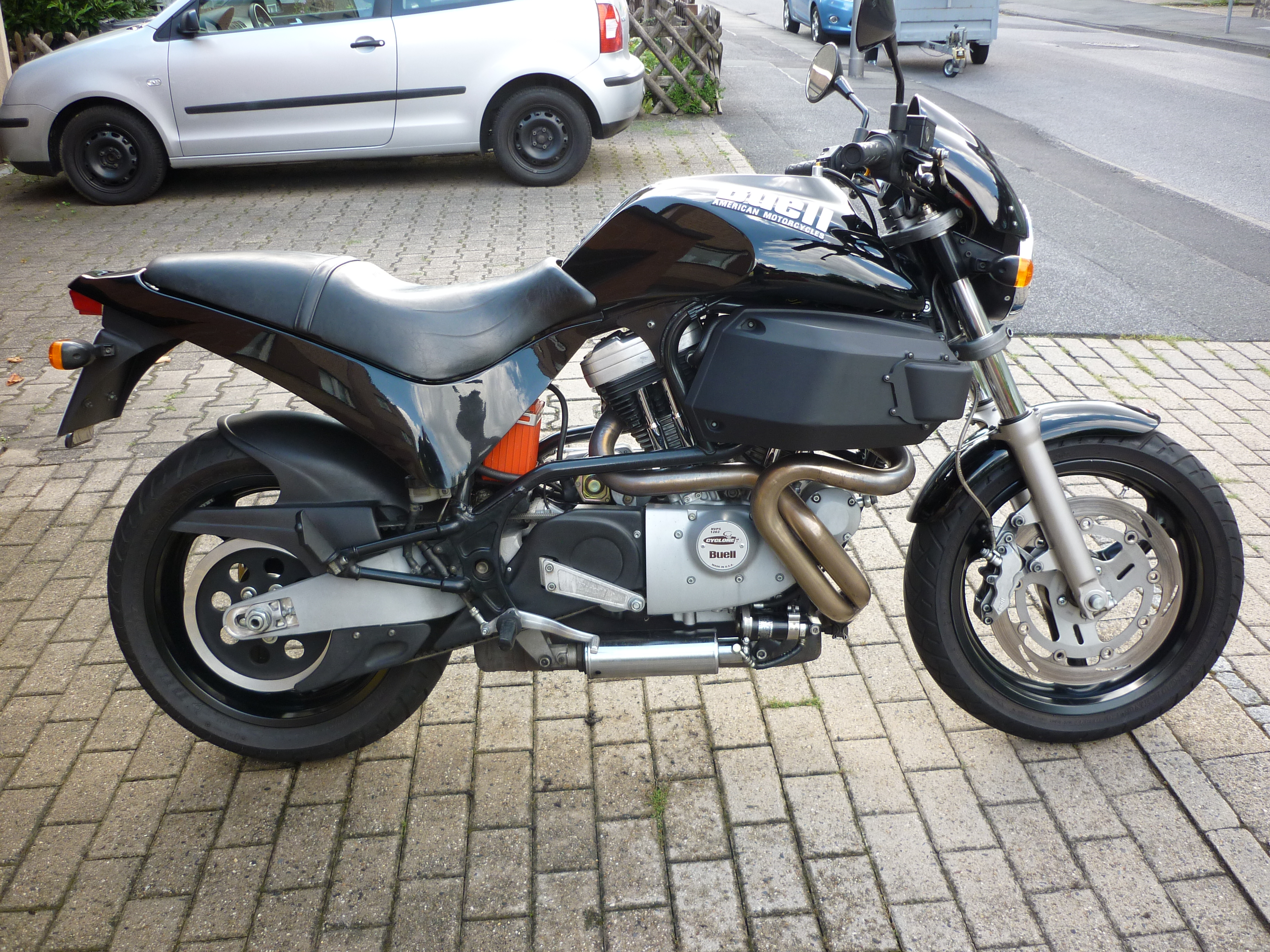
1999 Buell M2 Cyclone 1203cc sportster motor

Buell started with water-cooled two-stroke square-fours and ended with a water cooled four-stroke V-Twin, but the vast majority of their bikes used reworked 883 and 1200 Sportster engines. With Buell-designed heads, barrels, and in 1999 fuel injection, these all led to an increase in horsepower. They also had rubber mounting and a fan to cool the rear cylinder.

== See also ==
- List of Harley-Davidson motorcycles
- List of motorcycles of the 1950s
- Harley-Davidson engine timeline
