= Superprestigio Dirt Track =

Superprestigio Dirt Track is an invitational dirt track motorcycle race held at the Palau Sant Jordi in Barcelona, Spain.

== History ==
Established in 1979 by magazine publisher Jaime Alguersuari, Sr. as Superprestigio Internacional Solo Moto. Revived in 2014, and headlined by Marc Márquez, 2013, 2014, and 2016 MotoGP Champion and 2012 Moto2 Champion. The race has been held its new venue, Palau Sant Jordi, three times: January 11, 2014, December 13, 2014, and December 13, 2015.

The latest Superprestigio Dirt Track IV was held on December 17, 2016 and the latest Superprestigio dirt track was held in Paris on 15 dec 2018 at u arena

== Results ==
=== Superprestigio I, January 11, 2014 ===
==== Superprestigio Final ====
Pos	No.	Rider	Manufacturer
1	93	(Spain) Marc Márquez	Honda
2	53	(Spain) Tito Rabat	Honda
3	9	(United States) Kenny Noyes	Suzuki
4	41	(Spain) Aleix Espargaró	Yamaha
5	7	(Italy) Lorenzo Baldassarri	Kawasaki

==== Open Final ====
Pos	No.	Rider	Manufacturer
1	1	(United States) Brad Baker	KTM
2	3	(Spain) José Pedro Gómez	Yamaha
3	78	(United States) Merle Scherb	Yamaha
4	15	(Spain) Dani Ribalta	Kawasaki
5	68	(United Kingdom) Tom Neave	Honda

==== Superprestigio Superfinal ====
Pos	No.	Rider	Manufacturer
1	1	(United States) Brad Baker	KTM
2	53	(Spain) Tito Rabat	Honda
3	9	(United States) Kenny Noyes	Suzuki
4	41	(Spain) Aleix Espargaró	Yamaha
5	3	(Spain) José Pedro Gómez	Yamaha
6	78	(United States) Merle Scherb	Yamaha
7	15	(Spain) Dani Ribalta	Kawasaki
8	93	(Spain) Marc Márquez	Honda

=== Superprestigio II, December 13, 2014 ===
==== Superprestigio Final ====
Pos	No.	Rider	Manufacturer
1	93	(Spain) Marc Márquez	Honda
2	38	(United Kingdom) Bradley Smith	Yamaha
3	15	(Spain) Dani Ribalta	KTM
4	9	(United States) Kenny Noyes	Kawasaki
5	60	(Spain) Julián Simón	Honda
6	7	(Italy) Lorenzo Baldassarri	KTM
7	12	(Spain) Álex Márquez	Honda
8	88	(Spain) Ricky Cardús	Yamaha

==== Open Final ====
Pos	No.	Rider	Manufacturer
1	1	(United States) Jared Mees	Honda
2	4	(France) Thomas Chareyre	TM
3	17	(Spain) Gerard Bailo	Suzuki
4	28	(United Kingdom) Oliver Brindley	Kawasaki
5	25	(Spain) Iván Cervantes	KTM
6	30	(United Kingdom) Alan Birtwistle	Kawasaki
7	121	(Italy) Fabrizio Vesprini	Honda
8	14	(Finland) Joonas Kylmäkorpi	Zaeta

==== Superprestigio Superfinal ====
Pos	No.	Rider	Manufacturer
1	93	(Spain) Marc Márquez	Honda
2	9	(United States) Kenny Noyes	Kawasaki
3	38	(United Kingdom) Bradley Smith	Yamaha
4	15	(Spain) Dani Ribalta	KTM
5	88	(Spain) Ricky Cardús	Yamaha
6	7	(Italy) Lorenzo Baldassarri	KTM
7	60	(Spain) Julián Simón	Honda
8	12	(Spain) Álex Márquez	Honda

=== Superprestigio III, December 12, 2015 ===
==== Superprestigio Final ====
Pos	No.	Rider	Manufacturer
1	93	(Spain) Marc Márquez	Honda
2	97	(Spain) Xavi Vierge	Honda
3	15	(Spain) Dani Ribalta	KTM
4	142	(Spain) Álex Rins	Honda
5	24	(Spain) Toni Elías	Yamaha
6	2	(Spain) Marcos Ramírez	Honda
7	73	(Spain) Álex Márquez	Honda
8	19	(Belgium) Xavier Siméon	Suzuki

==== Open Final ====
Pos	No.	Rider	Manufacturer
1	6	(United States) Brad Baker	Honda
2	1	(United States) Jared Mees	Honda
3	66	(Sweden) Fredrik Lindgren	Honda
4	70	(Japan) Masatoshi Ohmori	Suzuki
5	30	(United Kingdom) Alan Birtwistle	Kawasaki
6	74	(Spain) Adrián Garín	Kawasaki
7	610	(Sweden) Joonas Kylmäkorpi	Pursang
8	4	(France) Thomas Chareyre	TM

==== Superprestigio Superfinal ====
Pos	No.	Rider	Manufacturer
1	6	(United States) Brad Baker	Honda
2	93	(Spain) Marc Márquez	Honda
3	1	(United States) Jared Mees	Honda
4	142	(Spain) Álex Rins	Honda
5	15	(Spain) Dani Ribalta	KTM
6	97	(Spain) Xavi Vierge	Honda
7	70	(Japan) Masatoshi Ohmori	Suzuki
8	66	(Sweden) Fredrik Lindgren	Honda

=== Superprestigio IV, December 17, 2016 ===
==== Superprestigio Entry List ====
Pos	No.	Rider	Manufacturer
	93	(Spain) Marc Márquez	Honda
	24	(Spain) Toni Elías	Suzuki
	73	(Spain) Álex Márquez	Honda
	18	(Spain) Nico Terol	Suzuki
	60	(Spain) Julián Simón	Yamaha
	11	(France) Vincent Philippe	Suzuki
	81	(Spain) Jordi Torres	Honda
	12	(Spain) Xavi Forés	Suzuki
	111	(Andorra) Rubén Xaus	Pursang
	19	(Belgium) Xavier Simeon	Suzuki
	88	(Spain) Ricky Cardús	Suzuki
	97	(Spain) Xavi Vierge	N/A
	23	(Germany) Marcel Schrötter	Suzuki
	2	(Switzerland) Jesko Raffin	Yamaha
	1	(United Kingdom) Kyle Smith	Honda
	21	(Italy) Fabio Di Giannantonio	Honda
	42	(Spain) Marcos Ramírez	Honda
	36	(Spain) Joan Mir	Honda
	8	(Spain) Jorge Martín	Honda
	29	(Spain) Raúl Fernández	Husqvarna
	75	(Spain) Albert Arenas	KTM
	15	(Spain) Dani Ribalta	Honda
	31	(Spain) Carmelo Morales	Yamaha

==== Open Class Entry List ====
Pos	No.	Rider	Manufacturer
	6	(United States) Brad Baker	Honda
	70	(Japan) Masatoshi Ohmori	Suzuki
	66	(Sweden) Fredrik Lindgren	Honda
	4	(France) Thomas Chareyre	TM
	64	(France) Sylvain Bidart	Honda
	74	(Italy) Francesco Cecchini	TM
	48	(Italy) Emanuele Marzotto	Yamaha
	30	(United Kingdom) Alan Birtwistle	Honda
	38	(United Kingdom) George Pickering	KTM
	124	(United Kingdom) Oliver Brindley	Kawasaki
	20	(United Kingdom) Toby Hales	Husqvarna
	971	(Australia) Tom Edwards	Suzuki
	181	(Italy) Gianni Borgiotti	Suzuki
	77	(Spain) Ferran Cardús	Suzuki
	215	(Spain) Ferran Sastre	Kawasaki
	17	(Spain) Gerard Bailo	Suzuki
	72	(Spain) Genis Gelada	Honda
	179	(Spain) Guillermo Cano	Honda
	34	(Spain) Jordi Casa	Honda
	79	(Spain) Josep Piedra	Husqvarna
	121	(Spain) Joan Noguera	Yamaha
	213	(Spain) Jaume Gaya Hernández	KTM

==== Superprestigio Final ====
Pos	No.	Rider	Manufacturer
1	93	(Spain) Marc Márquez	Honda
2	97	(Spain) Xavi Vierge	Honda
3	15	(Spain) Dani Ribalta	KTM
4	142	(Spain) Álex Rins	Honda
5	24	(Spain) Toni Elías	Yamaha
6	2	(Spain) Marcos Ramírez	Honda
7	73	(Spain) Álex Márquez	Honda
8	19	(Belgium) Xavier Siméon	Suzuki

==== Open Final ====
Pos	No.	Rider	Manufacturer
1	6	(United States) Brad Baker	Honda
2	1	(United States) Jared Mees	Honda
3	66	(Sweden) Fredrik Lindgren	Honda
4	70	(Japan) Masatoshi Ohmori	Suzuki
5	30	(United Kingdom) Alan Birtwistle	Kawasaki
6	74	(Spain) Adrián Garín	Kawasaki
7	610	(Sweden) Joonas Kylmäkorpi	Pursang
8	4	(France) Thomas Chareyre	TM

==== Superprestigio Superfinal ====
Pos	No.	Rider	Manufacturer
1	93	(Spain) Marc Márquez	Honda
2	24	(Spain) Toni Elías	Suzuki
3	6	(United States) Brad Baker	Honda
4	19	(Belgium) Xavier Simeon	Suzuki
5	17	(Spain) Gerard Bailo	Suzuki
6	23	(Germany) Marcel Schrötter	Suzuki
7	77	(Spain) Fernan Cardús	Suzuki
8	66	(France) Thomas Chareyre	TM

=== Superprestigio V, December 16, 2017 ===
==== Superprestigio Entry List ====
Pos	No.	Rider	Manufacturer
	24	(Spain) Toni Elías	Suzuki
	5	(France) Johann Zarco	Yamaha
	144	(France) Lucas Mahias	Yamaha
	50	(United Kingdom) Gregg Black	Suzuki
	11	(France) Vincent Philippe	Suzuki
	94	(Spain) David Checa	Yamaha
	20	(France) Fabio Quartararo	Suzuki
	97	(Spain) Xavi Vierge	Honda
	2	(Switzerland) Jesko Raffin	Suzuki
	87	(Australia) Remy Gardner	Yamaha
	21	(Italy) Fabio Di Giannantonio	Zaeta
	42	(Spain) Marcos Ramírez	KTM
	52	(Italy) Alessandro Delbianco	Honda
	75	(Spain) Albert Arenas	KTM
	31	(Spain) Carmelo Maorales	Yamaha
	15	(Spain) Dani Ribalta	Honda
	111	(Andorra) Rubén Xaus	TM
	34	(Spain) Xavier Pinsach	Honda

==== Open Class Entry List ====
Pos	No.	Rider	Manufacturer
	14	(United States) Briar Bauman	Kawasaki
	95	(United States) JD Beach	Yamaha
	4	(France) Thomas Chareyre	TM
	64	(France) Sylvain Bidart	Honda
	70	(Japan) Masatoshi Ohmori	Suzuki
	10	(Italy) Francesco Cecchini	Zaeta
	58	(Netherlands) Maikel Dijkstra	TM
	124	(United Kingdom) Oliver Brindley	Kawasaki
	120	(United Kingdom) Toby Hales	Husqvarna
	98	(United Kingdom) Richard Mason	Honda
	36	(Italy) Lorenzo Gabellini	Yamaha
	55	(France) Wilfried Delestre	Suzuki
	45	(Argentina) Matias Lorenzato	Suzuki
	1	(Spain) Ferran Cardús	Suzuki
	17	(Spain) Gerard Bailo	Suzuki
	18	(Spain) Franc Serra	Honda
	74	(Spain) Adrián Garín	Honda
	213	(Spain) Jaume Gaya Hernández	KTM
	33	(Spain) Sergi Sánchez	Honda
	179	(Spain) Guillermo Cano	Suzuki
	13	(Spain) Jaume Gaya Miró	KTM
	99	(Spain) Marc Capdevila	KTM

==== Superprestigio Superfinal ====
Pos	No.	Rider	Manufacturer
1	95	(United States) JD Beach	Yamaha
2	14	(United States) Briar Bauman	Kawasaki
3	1	(Spain) Ferran Cardús	Suzuki
4	24	(Spain) Toni Elías	Suzuki
5	21	(Italy) Fabio Di Giannantonio	Zaeta
6	75	(Spain) Albert Arenas	KTM
7	179	(Spain) Guillermo Cano	Suzuki
8	87	(Australia) Remy Gardner	Yamaha
