= Brad Baker (motorcyclist) =

American motorcycle racer

- Baker at Calistoga Half-Mile in 2017
- Born: February 18, 1993 (age 33); Centralia, Washington, U.S.
- Current team: Factory Indian Motorcycles
- Bike number: 6

Brad Baker (born February 18, 1993) is an AMA Pro Flat Track Racer from United States who has competed in the Championship since 2009, winning the Grand National Singles Championship in his first full-time year. He also won the Grand National Championship in 2013.

== AMA Pro Flat Track ==
Brad Baker (6) leads Jared Mees at the Sturgis TT 2017.

== Superprestigio Dirt Track ==
As the 2013 AMA Pro Flat Track Champion, Baker was invited to participate in the Superprestigio Dirt Track race on January 11, 2014, at the Palau Sant Jordi in Barcelona, Spain. In the Superfinal, in a close-fought battle for the lead, he and Marc Márquez collided, with Baker going on to win the event.

Baker returned to the December 13, 2014 Superprestigio, but fell during qualifying sustaining a dislocated shoulder and was unable to compete in the races.

On December 12, 2015, Baker would again compete in the Superprestigio Dirt Track against a host of international racers and also against his countryman, Jared Mees.

== X Games Harley-Davidson Flat-Track ==
Baker also competed in the 2015 X Games Harley-Davidson Flat-Track, placing third behind winner Bryan Smith.

On July 22, 2018, in qualifying for the 2018 X Games Harley-Davidson Flat-Track event, Baker experienced a severe high side that threw him over the bars. He was taken to a local hospital. After being rushed to the hospital, Baker spent the rest of the day undergoing back surgery to repair a multiple fractured T6 vertebrae. Fragments of his vertebrae damaged his spinal cord and was putting pressure on it causing paralysis from the middle of his back down. His future in American Flat Track is unknown.

Baker serves as a board member for the Rookies of 1979, an official charity of American Flat Track that benefits motorcyclists in track racing who were injured.

== Career highlights ==
- 2008- AMA Dirt Track Horizon Award Winner
- 2009- AMA Pro Single National Champion (Brothers Powersports Honda CRF450)
- 2010- 2nd in AMA Pro Single National Championship (Brothers Powersports Honda CRF450)
- 2011- 6th in AMA Grand National Championship: 9th in Expert Twins division (Lloyd Brothers Motorsport Ducati); 6th in Expert Singles division (Honda CRF450)
- 2012- 5th in AMA Grand National Championship: 7th in Expert Twins division (Dodge Bros Racing Harley-Davidson XR-750); 5th in Expert Singles division (Honda CRF450)
- 2013- AMA Grand National Champion: 2nd in Expert Twins division (Dodge Bros Racing Harley-Davidson XR-750); 1st in Expert Singles division (Honda CRF450)
- 2014- 5th in AMA Grand National Championship: 5th in Expert Twins (factory Harley-Davidson XR-750); 8th in Expert Singles division (Brothers Powersports Honda CRF450)
- 2015- 8th in AMA Grand National Championship (factory Harley-Davidson XR-750 and Brothers Powersports Honda CRF450)

Preceded by Jared Mees	AMA Pro Flat Track Champion; 2013	Succeeded by Jared Mees
