= Marc Márquez =

Spanish motorcycle racer (born 1993)

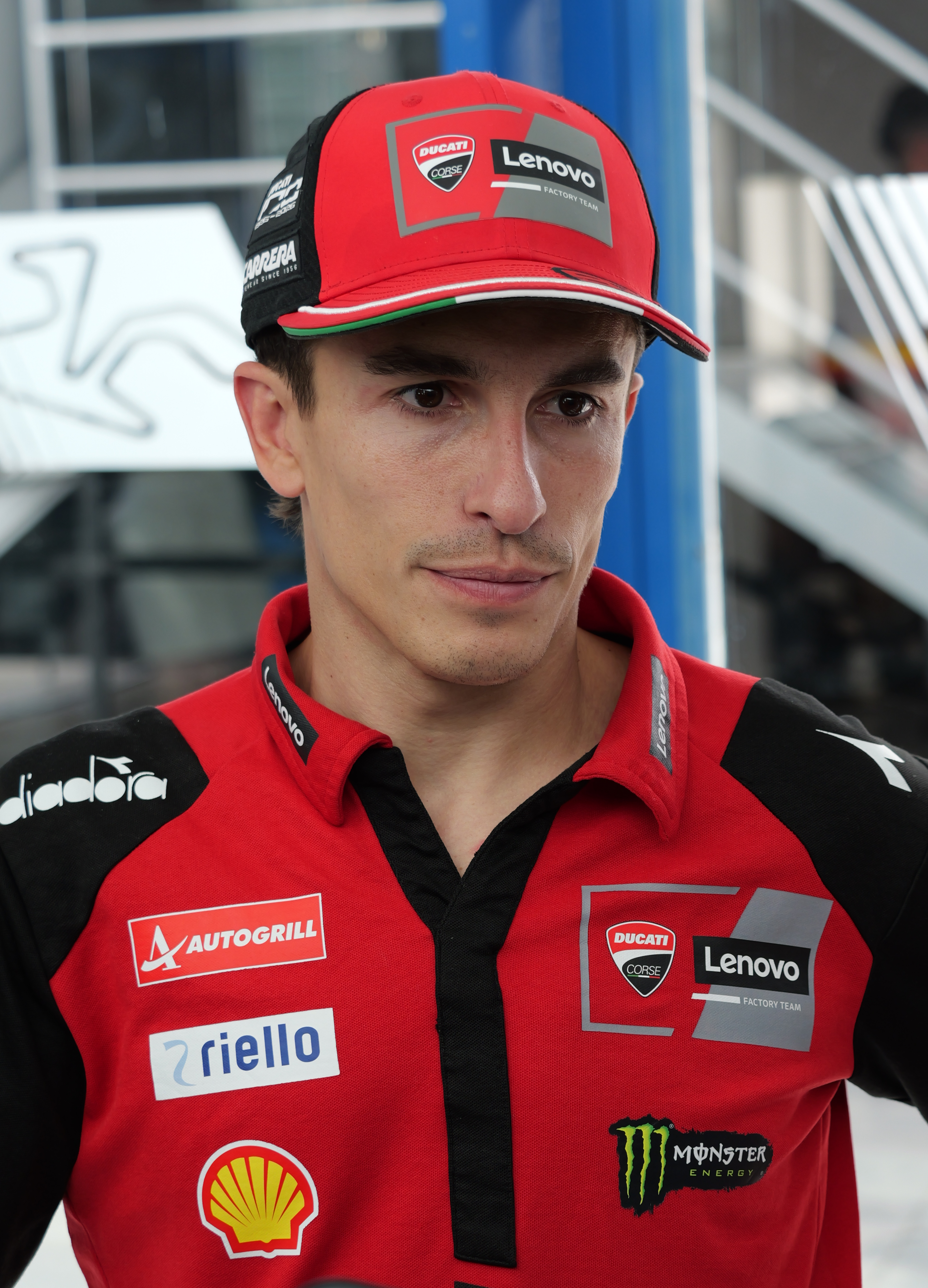
- Márquez at the 2026 Spanish Grand Prix
- Nationality: Spanish
- Born: 17 February 1993 (age 33); Cervera, Spain
- Current team: Ducati Lenovo Team
- Bike number: 93
- Website: marcmarquez93.com
Motorcycle racing career statistics
MotoGP World Championship
Active years	2013–
Manufacturers	Honda (2013–2023); Ducati (2024–)
Championships	8 (2013, 2014, 2016, 2017, 2018, 2019, 2025, 2026)
2026 championship position	1st (439 pts)
Starts / Wins / Podiums / Poles / F. laps / Points; 225 / 80 / 134 / 78 / 76 / 4002
Moto2 World Championship
Active years	2011–2012
Manufacturers	Suter
Championships	1 (2012)
2012 championship position	1st (328 pts)
Starts / Wins / Podiums / Poles / F. laps / Points; 32 / 16 / 25 / 14 / 7 / 579
125cc World Championship
Active years	2008–2010
Manufacturers	KTM (2008–2009); Derbi (2010)
Championships	1 (2010)
2010 championship position	1st (310 pts)
Starts / Wins / Podiums / Poles / F. laps / Points; 46 / 10 / 14 / 14 / 9 / 467

Marc Márquez Alentà (born 17 February 1993) is a Spanish Grand Prix motorcycle road racer who races for the Ducati Lenovo Team in MotoGP. He previously raced for Honda's factory team from 2013 to 2023, and for the Ducati satellite team Gresini Racing in 2024. Widely considered one of the greatest motorcycle racers of all time, he has won 10 Grand Prix World Championships, including eight in the MotoGP class (2013, 2014, 2016, 2017, 2018, 2019, 2025, and 2026).

As a teenager, Márquez won the 125cc World Championship in 2010, and the Moto2 World Championship in 2012. He moved into the MotoGP class in 2013 to ride for Repsol Honda. He won the title in his rookie season, becoming the first rider since Kenny Roberts in 1978 to do so, and the youngest to win it overall, at 20 years and 266 days. He received the Laureus World Sports Award for Breakthrough of the Year. In 2014 Márquez defended his title dominantly, winning the first ten races of the season back-to-back. He was ruled out of championship contention early in 2015 due to several crashes, with the season overshadowed by his tumultuous feud with Valentino Rossi.

In 2016, aged 23, Márquez equalled the all-time Grand Prix record for pole positions. He secured a further four consecutive championships in 2016, 2017, 2018, and a particularly dominant 2019. He was the youngest rider to win his seventh and eighth Grand Prix championships. At the delayed 2020 season-opener in Jerez, Márquez crashed and broke his right humerus. A premature attempt to return to competition further damaged his arm, and he sat out the rest of the season due to three surgeries. The injury continued to plague Márquez in 2021, and he contemplated retirement before he underwent a more successful fourth surgery on his arm at the Mayo Clinic in 2022.

Struggling with the increasingly adrift RC213V, Márquez severed his contract with Honda in 2023 and joined the satellite Gresini Ducati team for 2024. He finished the season in third place on year-old machinery and negotiated a two-year factory Ducati contract. In 2025, Márquez dominated the championship on the factory bike. His six-year drought between titles was the longest in history. His younger brother Álex Márquez finished runner-up, making them the first siblings to place first and second in any class of the Grand Prix motorcycle racing World Championship. One race after securing the title, Márquez suffered another injury which forced him to sit out for the rest of the season, and resulted in further surgeries in 2025 and 2026.

== Early life ==
Márquez was born to parents Roser Alentà and Julià Márquez on 17 February 1993 in Cervera, Catalonia. Márquez received his first dirt bike, a Yamaha PW50, at age four, and quickly took to competitive motocross racing. He finished runner-up in the Catalan junior motocross championship in 2000, and won it in 2001. That year, he also began road racing, which soon became his full-time discipline. In 2003, Márquez raced in the Open RACC 50cc series, and won the title at his first attempt.

In 2004, Márquez graduated to a 125cc bike. He raced in the Catalan 125cc championship, with Pol Espargaró as his teammate. Márquez finished runner-up to Espargaró in 2004, and won the championship in 2005 and 2006. In 2006, Márquez also made his debut in the 125cc Spanish Road Racing Championship (CEV), where he finished eighth. He was disadvantaged due to his size: at twelve years old, he was 1.29 m (4 ft 3 in) tall and weighed just 29 kilos. His team fitted his bike and leathers with 21 kilos' extra weight to compensate. He finished the 2007 season ninth after several crashes, but showed enough potential to move into the world championship for the 2008 season.

== Career ==
=== 125cc World Championship ===
==== 2008 ====
Márquez made his championship debut on 13 April 2008 as a KTM rider at the 125cc Portuguese Grand Prix, aged 15 years and 56 days. In just his sixth race in the category, at the British Grand Prix, Márquez came third. He became the youngest Spanish rider to take a podium in Grand Prix motorcycle racing. He was the only rider of a non-Piaggio bike to achieve a podium all season, and finished ranked thirteenth in the standings.

==== 2009 ====
In 2009, Márquez scored another podium with a third place at Jerez. He achieved his first pole position at the French Grand Prix at 16 years and 88 days, becoming the youngest Spanish rider to take pole in a motorcycling world championship. He took a second pole position in Malaysia, but retired from both races. Márquez finished ranked eighth in the standings, 21 places above the other KTM bike.

==== 2010 ====
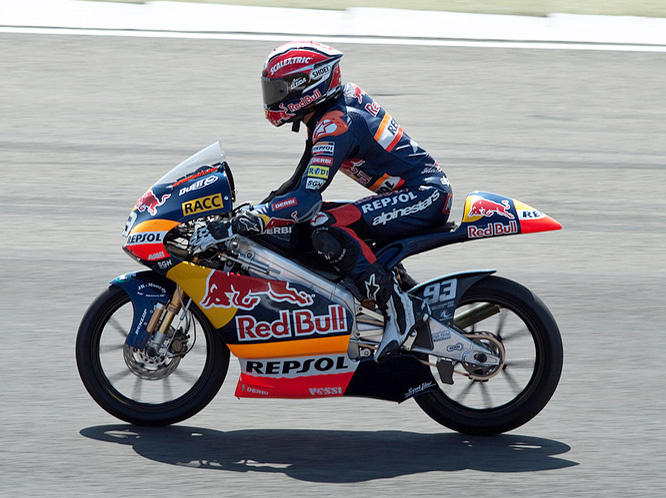
Márquez at the 2010 Dutch TT

Márquez received a much faster Derbi bike in 2010, which he rode for Red Bull Ajo. He promptly took two podiums in the first three races, and on 6 June, Márquez won his first Grand Prix race at Mugello. He immediately followed this with victories at Silverstone, Assen, and Barcelona, becoming the youngest rider ever to win four successive races. With yet another win at the Sachsenring, Márquez became the first rider since Valentino Rossi in 1997 to win five successive races in 125cc racing.

Márquez faltered across the next four rounds, winning in Misano but struggling in Brno and Indianapolis. After retiring from Aragon due to an accident with Randy Krummenacher at the first corner, he dropped to third in the standings behind Nicolás Terol and Pol Espargaró. Márquez then claimed another four successive wins, in Motegi, Malaysia, Australia, and Estoril, to gain a 17-point lead over Terol with one round to go. The race in Estoril was red-flagged due to rain when Márquez was running in second behind Terol. Before the race was restarted, Márquez fell on the sighting lap and had to return to the pits for repairs. He was forced to start at the back of the field, having not made it out of pit lane quickly enough. Despite this, Márquez won the race. He then finished fourth in Valencia to claim his first world title. At 17 years and 263 days old, he was the second-youngest world champion ever, behind Loris Capirossi.

=== Moto2 World Championship ===
==== 2011 ====
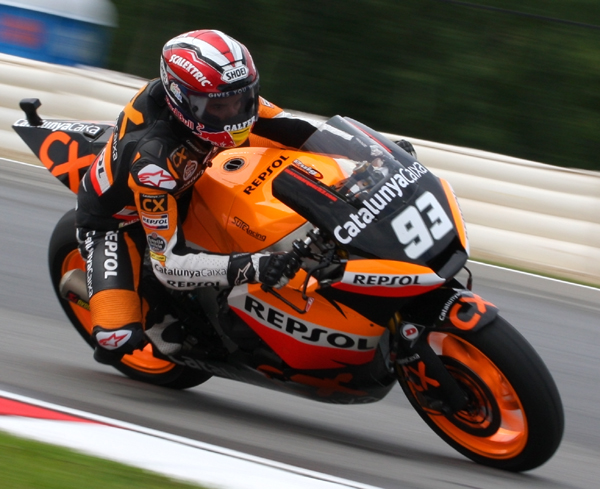
Márquez at the 2011 Czech Republic Grand Prix

Márquez moved into the Moto2 class for 2011 to begin a two-year stint as the sole rider of the new team Monlau Competición, run by his manager Emilio Alzamora. After struggling for three races with two retirements and a 21st place finish, Márquez took his first Moto2 victory in Le Mans. At his home race in Catalonia, Márquez finished second behind championship leader Stefan Bradl. He took his first pole position in Silverstone, but once again crashed and retired. With Bradl having taken four victories in the first six races, Márquez trailed him by 82 points.

Márquez made a mid-season surge up the championship standings, winning six of the next seven races to move within six points of Bradl. After finishing second to Bradl's fourth at Motegi, Márquez took the championship lead by one point. In Australia, Márquez crashed into the back of Ratthapark Wilairot after the free practice had been concluded, and was given a one-minute penalty on his qualifying time for riding in an "irresponsible manner". The penalty ensured Márquez would start the race from last on the grid, but he carved his way through the field to finish in third place. The championship still seemed likely to be his.

Despite rumors of a move to MotoGP, Márquez confirmed before the Malaysian Grand Prix that he would remain in Moto2 for the 2012 season. In the opening minutes of the first free practice session in Malaysia, Márquez crashed on a damp patch of asphalt alongside several other riders. He suffered nerve inflammation which caused him to develop diplopia. After sitting out two further practice sessions, Márquez completed two laps in the qualifying session, but his times only placed him 36th on the grid. He did not start the race, as he failed a medical examination prior to the warm-up on race morning. Márquez attended the final race of the season in Valencia, in the hope of being fit to compete, but withdrew due to continued vision problems, handing Bradl the title.

==== 2012 ====
Márquez returned with a vengeance in 2012. He claimed six pole positions across the first eight rounds, winning in Qatar, Estoril, Assen, and Germany, and claiming further podiums in Jerez, Catalonia, and Silverstone. He came fifth in Mugello, before taking three consecutive wins in Indianapolis, Brno, and Misano. Despite Pol Espargaró winning the race, Márquez clinched the world championship with a second-place finish in Australia.

Márquez had developed a reputation as an aggressive rider during his stint in Moto2 which peaked due to a number of incidents in 2012. After the season-opener in Qatar, he received a warning over an incident where he overtook Thomas Lüthi aggressively on the final lap, forcing him wide. Lüthi slapped Márquez on the arm in retaliation, which caused him to also receive a warning. Collisions with Pol Espargaró at Catalonia and Mika Kallio at Motegi brought Márquez further controversy. Following the news of his imminent move to MotoGP, a new penalty points system was announced to discourage irresponsible riding.

During a practice session for his final Moto2 race in Valencia, Márquez knocked Simone Corsi off his bike while attempting an overtake and was penalised for dangerous riding. Demoted to 33rd position on the starting grid, Márquez carved through every other rider on track to win the race. This performance, which involved overtaking 20 bikes on the first lap alone, is widely recognised as one of the best racing comebacks of all time, and one of the signature performances of Márquez's career. He finished the season with nine race wins, and only finished off the podium in three races, two of those being DNFs. Márquez's results also handed Suter the Moto2 constructors' title.

=== MotoGP World Championship ===
==== Repsol Honda Team (2013–2023) ====
On 12 July 2012, it was announced that Márquez had signed a two-year contract with the Repsol Honda team in MotoGP to replace the retiring Casey Stoner as Dani Pedrosa's teammate from 2013 onwards. Márquez tested the Honda RC213V for the first time in Valencia after the end of the 2012 championships, lapping just over a second slower than Pedrosa, who topped the time sheets. Márquez was impressive again during the MotoGP tests at Sepang. He finished the first two days of testing in third position, just behind Pedrosa and Jorge Lorenzo, and ahead of Valentino Rossi in fourth, before swapping places with Rossi on the final day. At Honda's private test in Austin, Márquez topped the timesheets on all three days.

===== 2013: Rookie champion =====
Márquez started the 2013 season with a podium finish on his MotoGP debut in Qatar. Having qualified sixth, he ended up fighting Rossi in a widely-publicised last lap battle for second place. Márquez lost out to Rossi and finished third behind him and Lorenzo. In Márquez's second MotoGP race, at the new Circuit of the Americas in Texas, he took pole position and held off his teammate Pedrosa to claim his maiden victory in the MotoGP class. He became the youngest ever premier-class race winner at 20 years, 63 days, beating Freddie Spencer's 30-year-old record. At Jerez, Márquez finished in second position behind Pedrosa. On the final lap of the race, Márquez created his first controversy in the premier class by aggressively overtaking Lorenzo at the corner which had been named "Lorenzo Corner" that same weekend. Despite Lorenzo's annoyance, it was deemed a racing incident.

At Le Mans, Márquez took the second pole of his MotoGP career, 0.03 seconds ahead of Lorenzo. He made a bad race start and spent many laps battling outside the top five. He overtook Andrea Dovizioso with two laps left to claim his fourth podium finish in as many races, tying Max Biaggi's record from 1998. Márquez endured a tough weekend in Mugello, where he crashed twice on Friday. Despite a third crash during Saturday morning practice, he qualified on the second row. He suffered his fourth crash of the weekend during the race with only three laps to go, and recorded his first non-finish since joining the premier class. Márquez took another third-place podium at Catalonia. In Assen, Márquez suffered a huge highside in morning practice, causing small fractures in his fingers and toes. Despite this, he again finished the race in second place.

At the Sachsenring, with main rivals Pedrosa and Lorenzo both injured, Márquez took his third pole position in MotoGP and claimed his second MotoGP victory. At Laguna Seca, Márquez won his third race, extending his championship lead to 16 points over Pedrosa. At the trademark Laguna Seca "Corkscrew", Márquez replicated Rossi's infamous overtake on Casey Stoner in 2008 to pass Rossi himself. After the race, Rossi jokingly strangled Márquez in parc fermé before hugging him. At Indianapolis, Márquez took pole and his fourth win of the year by just over three seconds. At Brno, there was an intense battle between Márquez and Lorenzo, who swapped places several times. Márquez made the final pass at Turn 3 with just under four laps to go, and became the first rider to win four consecutive races since Rossi in 2008.

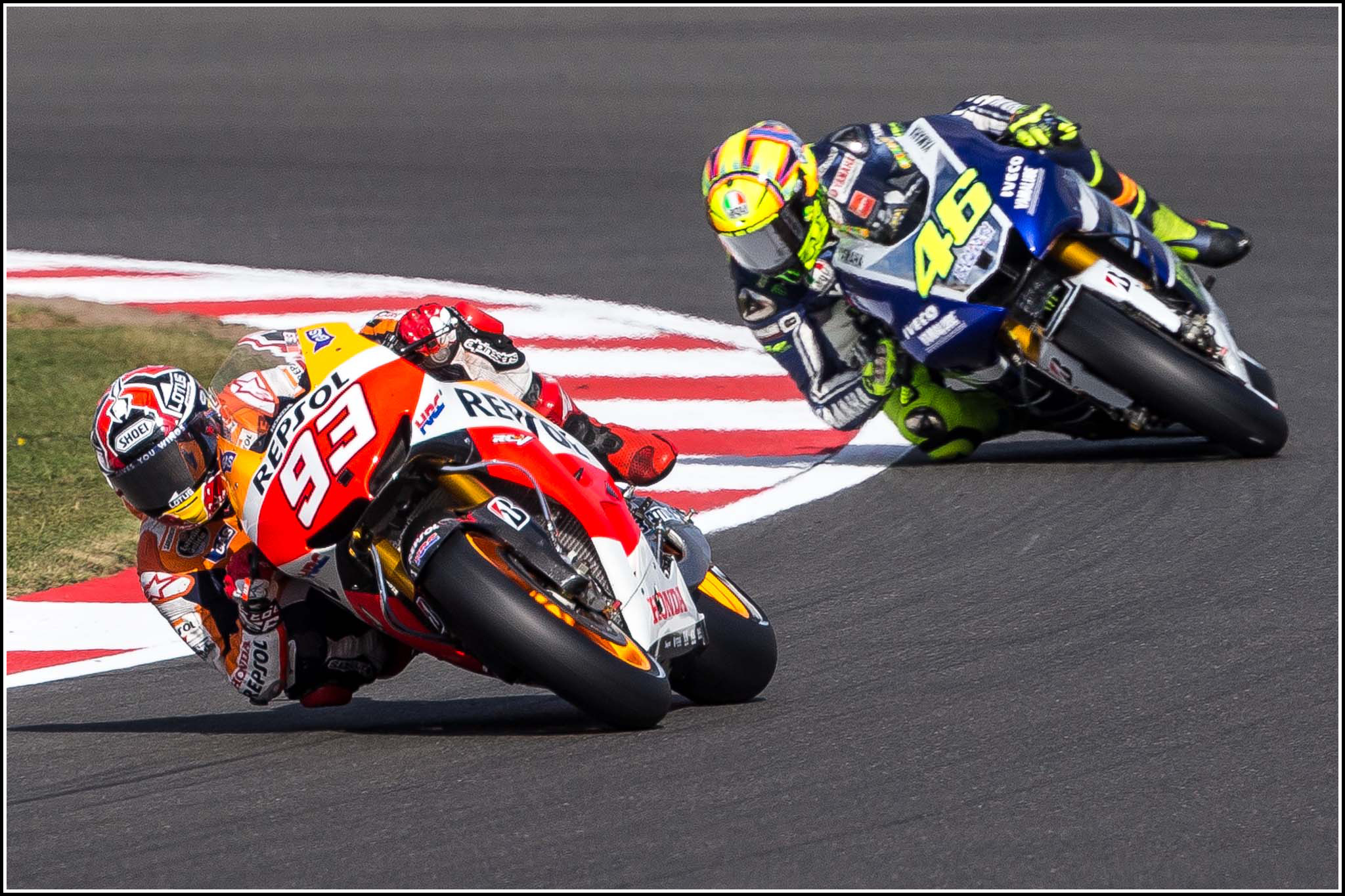
Márquez and Valentino Rossi at the 2013 British Grand Prix

During Sunday morning warm up at Silverstone, Márquez crashed and dislocated his shoulder. He was nonetheless declared fit to race. Márquez and Lorenzo pulled away from the field together during the early laps. In the final laps they traded places and paint; Márquez lost out and finished second. At Misano, Márquez topped qualifying by over half a second to claim pole position, but again finished the race second to Lorenzo. At Aragon, Márquez claimed a seventh pole position. Again he lost the lead to Lorenzo in the first corner, and found himself trailing by two seconds. This time he soon caught up to Lorenzo, and ultimately crossed the line over a second ahead for his sixth victory of the season. With four races left, Márquez had a 39-point championship lead from second-placed Lorenzo.

At Sepang, Márquez took his fourth consecutive pole position and finished in second place. At Phillip Island, a mandatory pit stop after ten laps was introduced by race direction due to tyre problems. Honda misunderstood the directive, leaving Márquez on the track for an eleventh lap, and he was disqualified. This incident reduced his championship lead over race winner Lorenzo from 43 points to 18 with two rounds to go. At Motegi, Márquez recovered from a heavy fall on the morning of the race to finish second behind Lorenzo. His lead shrank to 13 points, meaning a fourth-place finish at Valencia would be sufficient to crown him champion even if Lorenzo won. Márquez rode with uncharacteristic restraint and finished in third to secure the championship. He became the youngest champion in series history.

===== 2014: Domination =====
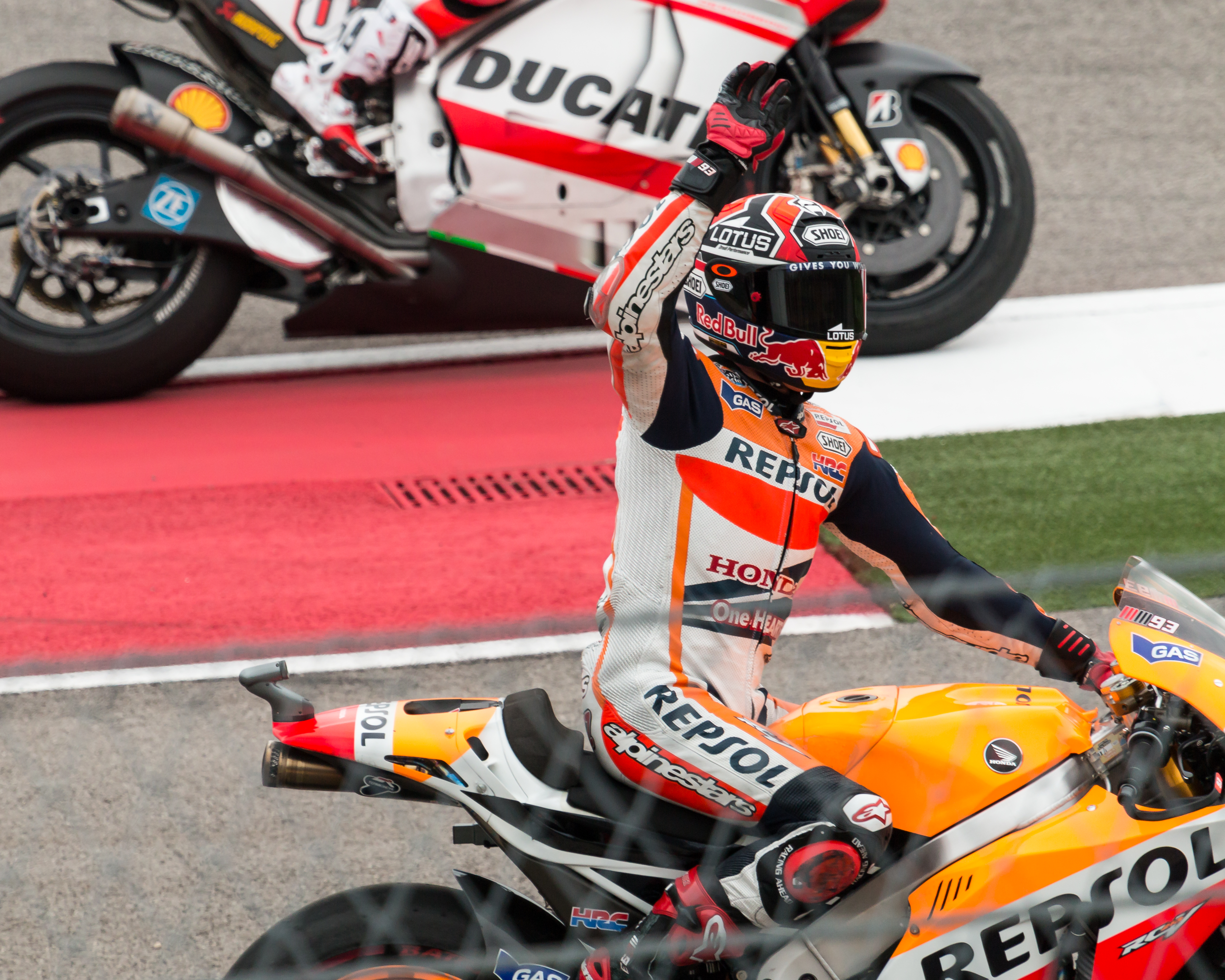
Márquez after winning the 2014 Grand Prix of the Americas

Márquez produced the fastest times on all three days of the first preseason test in Malaysia. He then suffered a broken right leg, and was unable to take part in the second Malaysian test or the Phillip Island tyre test. At the 2014 season opener in Qatar, Márquez demonstrated strong pace on Saturday afternoon and took pole position. He made an average start to the race, dropping to fourth place on lap one. He gradually worked his way to the front of the race and emerged victorious from a tense battle with Rossi in the second half of the race, winning by 0.259 seconds. Márquez then proceeded to win each of the next five rounds in Texas, Argentina, Spain, France, and Italy, all from pole position.

At the Catalan Grand Prix, Márquez failed to take pole for the first time all season, qualifying third after crashing during the session. This turned out not to matter: Márquez held off attacks from each of Pedrosa, Lorenzo and Rossi to win his seventh consecutive race, extending his championship lead to 58 points over second-placed Rossi. Márquez's younger brother Álex won the Moto3 race, and they became the first siblings to win Grand Prix races on the same day. The brothers repeated the feat at the Dutch TT two weeks later. At his most dominant circuit, the Sachsenring, Márquez again won the race, becoming the youngest rider to win nine consecutive races in the premier class. He claimed a tenth successive victory at Indianapolis to become the third rider to achieve such a feat in the premier class, after Mick Doohan and Giacomo Agostini.

Márquez suffered his first defeat of the season at Brno, where he finished fourth. He then won yet again at Silverstone. At Misano, Márquez crashed while battling for the race lead with Rossi; he remounted and was able to score one championship point. Márquez and Pedrosa crashed in heavy rain late in the race at Aragon and finished 13th and 14th, with Lorenzo claiming his first race of the year due to superior tyre strategy. Lorenzo won again at Motegi, while Márquez finished second to clinch his second MotoGP championship with three rounds remaining.

At Phillip Island, Márquez took his 12th pole position of the season, matching the record set by Casey Stoner in 2011, but he crashed out while leading the race, his first non-finish since the 2013 Italian Grand Prix. At Sepang, Márquez broke Stoner's record by claiming his 13th pole position of the season and his 50th Grand Prix pole position. He also took his 12th win of the season, matching Mick Doohan's 1997 record of most premier class victories in a single year. Márquez's result meant Honda claimed the manufacturers' championship with a race to spare. At the final race in Valencia, Márquez broke Doohan's record by taking a 13th win to cap off his utterly dominant season.

===== 2015: Controversy =====
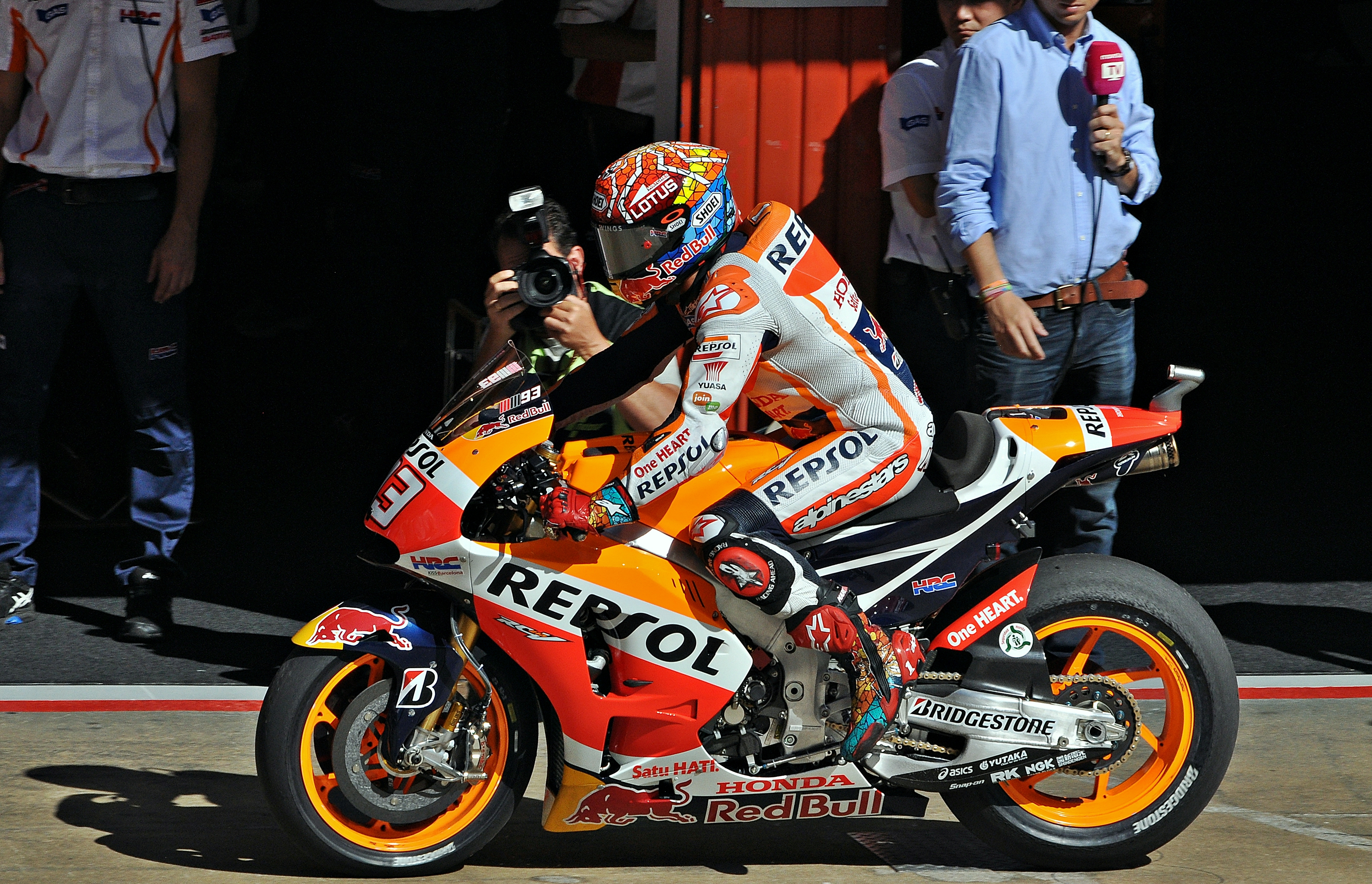
Márquez at the 2015 Catalan Grand Prix

Márquez was the favorite to win the championship for the 2015 season, but he struggled to feel comfortable on that year's bike, leading to a string of crashes and retirements. Márquez began the season with a fifth-place finish in Qatar after a mistake at Turn 1 dropped him to the back of the field. He then won in Texas, his third successive triumph at the Circuit of the Americas. In Argentina, Márquez started from pole, and at one point led the race by four seconds. However, Rossi caught up to Márquez on lap 22. The two riders made contact at Turn 5 with two laps remaining, and Márquez crashed out of the race to record his first non-finish since the 2014 Australian Grand Prix.

Márquez finished second behind Lorenzo in Spain, despite riding with a finger fractured by a dirt-track accident. In France, he took his third pole position of the season, but dropped down to seventh place at the start and finished in fourth. He crashed out of the races in both Italy and Catalonia, unable to find the safe limit of his bike. In Assen, Márquez was involved in another controversial battle with Rossi. On the final lap, they made contact at the final chicane, causing Rossi to cut across the gravel trap; he claimed victory and Márquez returned to the podium in second place.

Márquez took consecutive victories in Germany and Indianapolis, two of his strongest circuits. He recorded a second-place finish at Brno behind Lorenzo. He then crashed out at Silverstone in wet conditions, his fourth non-finish of the season. A win at Misano put Márquez level with Rossi at four races apiece, but he still trailed both Rossi and Lorenzo in the championship standings. Márquez crashed out once again in Aragon, and a fourth-place finish in Motegi ended his hopes of retaining the title.

At the Australian Grand Prix, Márquez secured his eighth pole of the season. The race soon became hotly contested: Márquez quickly lost the lead, with Iannone and Lorenzo fighting at the front throughout the first lap. Iannone led the race into the second lap, but was bizarrely hit by a seagull, and his lapse in concentration allowed Lorenzo to retake him, and Márquez to rejoin the leading pack. The three leaders continued to fight with each other, allowing Rossi to catch up to them. Lorenzo began to establish a gap, leaving Márquez, Iannone and Rossi in a three-way battle for second place. As the final lap began, Lorenzo was running first, Iannone second, Márquez third, and Rossi fourth. Márquez swept into a devastatingly quick final lap, overtaking Iannone and Lorenzo. This was Márquez's 50th Grand Prix win. At 22 years and 243 days, he became the ninth rider to reach that mark, and the youngest to do so.

The Malaysian Grand Prix was overshadowed by the events of the pre-race press conference, during which Rossi unexpectedly accused Márquez of slowing him down in Australia to help Lorenzo win the championship. This incited a press furore, as well as outrage from Rossi's many loyal fans. Márquez and Rossi then engaged in an intense fight during the Malaysian race, culminating in an incident where Rossi forced Márquez out wide, they collided, and Márquez crashed. Márquez insisted Rossi had deliberately kicked him off his bike. The incident was reviewed by Race Direction after the race, and Rossi was given three penalty points: enough to enforce a start from the back of the grid at the final race in Valencia. Márquez finished second to Lorenzo in Valencia, and Lorenzo took the world title.

===== 2016: Reclaiming the title =====
The 2016 season looked daunting for Honda, who were concerned about their bike's compatibility with the grid's new Michelin tyres. Márquez took third place at the season-opener in Qatar. He won the second race of the year in Argentina, where a mandatory bike swap was enforced due to concerns over tyre durability. Márquez then put in a customarily dominant performance at the Circuit of the Americas, crossing the line six seconds ahead of Lorenzo to take an early championship lead. At Jerez, he finished third, behind both factory Yamahas. Márquez's Honda suffered from an acceleration deficit in Le Mans, forcing him to push in the braking zones to fight for a podium place. He collided with Dovizioso at Turn 7 and remounted to finish thirteenth.

Márquez took three consecutive second places in Italy, Catalonia, and Assen. He then claimed a fourth pole of the season at his most dominant circuit, the Sachsenring. The race was declared wet, and Márquez began the race with a soft rain tyre on his front wheel. He progressively lost ground, falling to ninth position after a trip into the gravel trap at Turn 8. He then pitted earlier than the rest of the leading riders, gambling on a switch to slick tyres. This decision paid off, and Márquez soon began recovering positions from fourteenth place. Lapping four seconds faster than the race leaders on wets, he eventually claimed victory with a lead of just under ten seconds.

Márquez took fifth place at the Red Bull Ring in Austria, third place in Brno, and fourth place at both Silverstone and Misano. At one of his strongest circuits, Aragon, he claimed pole, set the fastest lap, and won the race. This victory handed him a long shot at the championship in Motegi. Márquez won the race, while polesitter Rossi and Lorenzo both crashed out of it in a rare double Yamaha DNF. Márquez therefore clinched his third MotoGP title, and fifth world title overall. At Phillip Island, the newly crowned champion crashed out of the race while leading. He then crashed again in Malaysia while chasing the leading trio in tricky wet conditions, but remounted the bike and finished in eleventh position. At the season finale in Valencia, Márquez found himself trapped behind Rossi and Iannone in the first part of the race, jockeying for a podium position. He managed to break away from them in the second half of the race and began hunting down race leader Lorenzo, but ultimately had settle for a second place finish.

===== 2017: Down to the wire =====
Márquez began the 2017 season with a fourth place finish in Qatar. He took pole position in Argentina, but crashed out of the lead alongside teammate Pedrosa. Márquez stormed to another pole position at the Circuit of the Americas and duly won the race, extending his perfect record of four pole positions and four wins at the circuit since its introduction onto the MotoGP calendar. In Jerez, Márquez took second place behind Pedrosa. Márquez recorded another non-finish in Le Mans, followed by a disappointing sixth place finish at Mugello, struggling in both races with the Honda's lack of acceleration off the corners. In Catalonia, he finished second despite suffering several crashes throughout practice and qualifying. He then won a close late-race battle with Dovizioso and Crutchlow in the Netherlands to record another much-needed podium finish.

Márquez's fortunes began to improve at his favored Sachsenring, where he took yet another pole position and victory to extend his streak there to eight consecutive wins across all classes. For the first time, he took the lead in the championship standings. At Brno, the race was declared wet. Márquez took pole but found himself slipping back through the field on soft tyres in the wet, and took the early gamble to switch to slicks. Having once again outfoxed his rivals in flag-to-flag conditions, he powered back through the field and took victory by over twelve seconds. In Austria, Márquez took second after losing out to Dovizioso in a thrilling last-lap battle. Márquez then suffered a rare engine failure at Silverstone, where Dovizioso claimed victory, leaving them tied in the championship standings. Márquez fought back by claiming back-to-back wins: first in a wet race at Misano, and then in Aragon. In Japan, Márquez again lost out to Dovizioso in a dramatic last-lap battle for victory.

Márquez qualified in pole for a race at Phillip Island which became an instant classic. For much of the race he was forced to skirmish in a leading supergroup formed of eight riders: Márquez, Rossi, Zarco, Viñales, Iannone, Crutchlow, Jack Miller, and Álex Rins. Eventually Márquez broke through and was able to establish a gap from the rest of the pack, crossing the line 1.8 seconds clear of Rossi. This performance extended his championship lead over Dovizioso to 33 points, as Dovizioso finished 13th after running off track. However, Márquez missed out on clinching the title in Malaysia, where he finished fourth to Dovizioso's first. The title contest therefore continued to the last round in Valencia. Márquez started the race from pole, but narrowly avoided crashing at Turn 1 and dropped from first to fifth position. Moments later, Dovizioso crashed at turn eight, handing Márquez his sixth world title.

===== 2018: Consistency =====
Márquez kicked off the 2018 season by losing yet another last-lap battle for victory with Dovizioso in Qatar. He then courted controversy in a bizarre race in Argentina after stalling his bike while lining up on the grid. In an attempt to restart it, he pushed the bike away from his grid position. After the race started, he was issued a ride-through penalty for riding his bike in the wrong direction on the track. Rejoining near the back of the field, Márquez began ploughing through the field. He was issued a second penalty for irresponsible riding following a collision with Aleix Espargaró, and was required to drop a position. Towards the end of the race, Márquez then collided with Rossi and toppled him onto the wet grass. This reignited their feud and earned Márquez a third penalty. Márquez finished the race in fifth, having easily set the fastest lap, but due to the third infraction was handed a 30-second time penalty and did not receive points.

At the Circuit of the Americas, Márquez customarily qualified on pole but was handed a three-place grid penalty for impeding Maverick Viñales. Márquez nevertheless won the race, maintaining his perfect record in Texas. At Jerez he survived a high-speed slide caused by gravel on the track to score a second consecutive victory, followed by a third at Le Mans. Both victories were his first at those circuits since 2014, and gave Márquez a commanding lead in the championship. He crashed out of Mugello, and recorded a second-place finish in Catalonia. He then claimed pole for an instant classic in Assen, featuring over 100 overtakes and six different race leaders. After a long-fought battle within the leading group of seven riders (Márquez, Rossi, Lorenzo, Crutchlow, Rins, Viñales, and Dovizioso), Márquez peeled away from the group and took victory over two seconds ahead of Rins. In Germany, Márquez had to scrap more than usual, but still scored pole position, the fastest lap, and his ninth consecutive victory at the circuit.

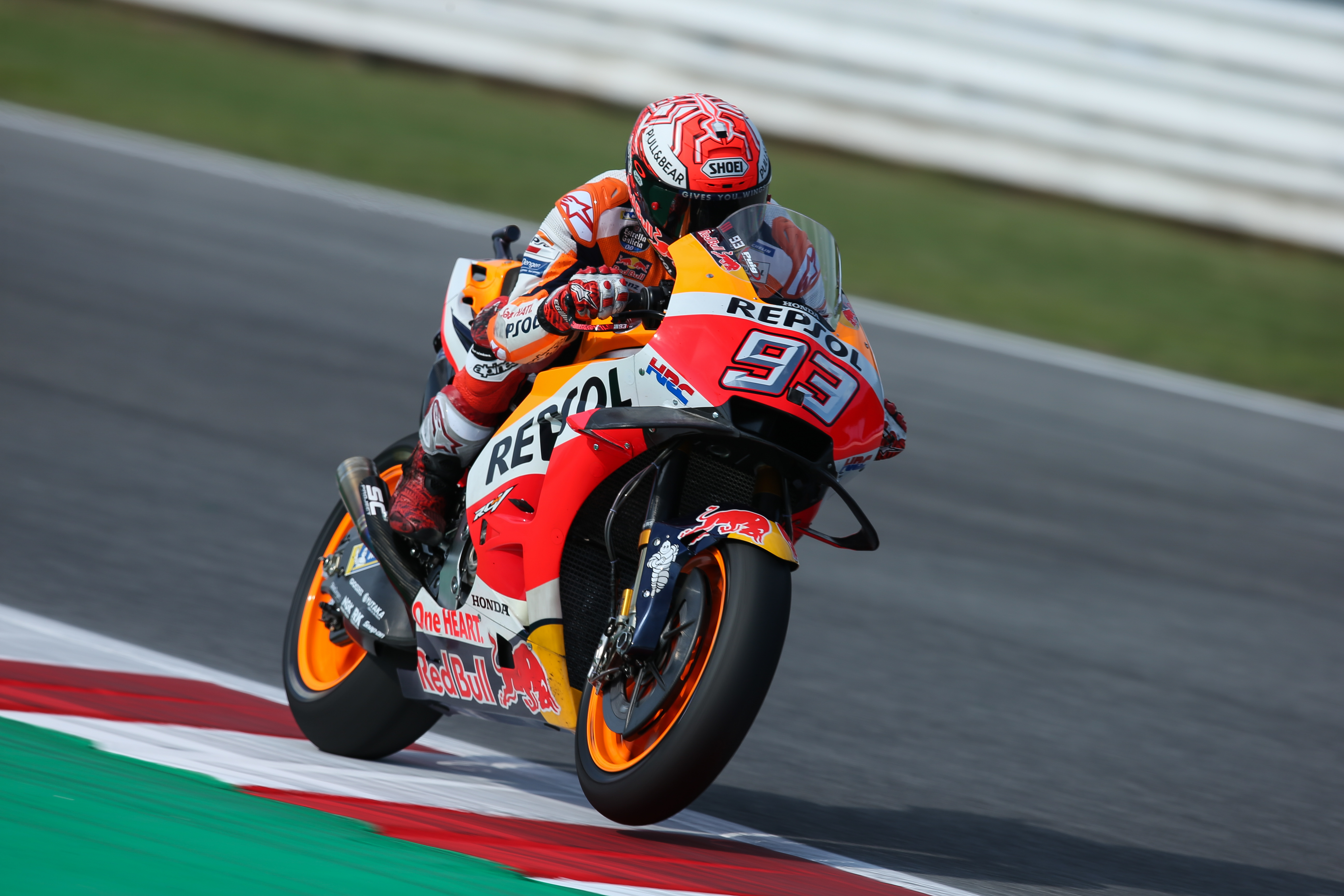
Márquez at the 2018 San Marino Grand Prix

After the summer break, Ducati won in Brno, where Márquez finished third, and in Austria, where Márquez settled for second after losing a last-lap duel to Lorenzo. His championship lead still remained strong. Ducati took a third consecutive win at Misano, with Dovizioso leading Márquez across the line. Márquez then won three successive duels with Dovizioso, in Aragon, Thailand, and Japan. At all three circuits, Dovizioso established an early lead, but Márquez laid in wait to pull off a series of successful late passes. In Japan, Dovizioso crashed on the penultimate lap while trying to catch Márquez to attempt a repass. This left him without points, and Márquez cruised over the finish line to score a third consecutive win and a seventh world title. He became the first rider to win three consecutive titles in the premier class since Valentino Rossi. During the celebrations, Márquez dislocated his shoulder after being hugged by Scott Redding.

Márquez qualified on pole in Australia, but was overtaken by both Dovizioso and Miller on the seventh lap. Three laps later, the rear end of Márquez's bike was struck by Johann Zarco. Zarco crashed and Márquez's bike took damage which ended his race. Márquez took another pole position in Malaysia, but received a six-place grid penalty following an incident with Iannone in qualifying. He powered through the field to catch race leader Rossi, who crashed out of the race and handed Márquez his ninth victory of the season. At the season finale in Valencia, Márquez crashed, having chosen harder wet tyres than his rivals on a soaked track.

===== 2019: Domination again =====
Márquez's preparations for the 2019 season were compromised due to a shoulder surgery. He still managed to take the fight for victory in Qatar to the final corner, where he ultimately lost out to Dovizioso again. Márquez dominated proceedings in Argentina from start to finish, claiming pole, the fastest lap, and cruising to victory by almost ten seconds. He set pole at the Circuit of the Americas for a seventh consecutive season, but surprisingly crashed out of the lead, ruining his perfect record at that circuit. Honda attributed this to a problem with the new engine brake in low-speed corners. Márquez avenged the crash by reclaiming the title lead with a composed win at Jerez, where he once again led from start to finish. He took a third victory in France, where he pulled into the lead after an early fight with Jack Miller.

Márquez had to settle for second at Mugello, after a three-man battle with Ducati duo Dovizioso and race-winner Danilo Petrucci. In Catalonia, Márquez was threatened early on in the race by strong starts from several of his rivals. However, his new teammate Lorenzo lost the front end of his bike on the second lap, triggering a collision which eliminated Lorenzo, Dovizioso, Viñales, and Rossi from the race. Márquez narrowly escaped the pile-up and breezed across the line unchallenged. In Assen, Márquez increased his title lead by finishing second to Viñales, who was 95 points adrift in the title standings. The other championship contenders all had a difficult race. Márquez unsurprisingly dominated at the Sachsenring, where he set pole, the fastest lap, and won his tenth consecutive race at the circuit.

Returning from summer break, Márquez set an extraordinary pole position at Brno. Qualifying was run in changeable conditions, but the circuit was dry enough to go out on slick tyres. Having set pole with his penultimate lap, Márquez then continued out for another lap despite the final sector now being drenched in rain. He powered through the wet track on his slick tyres to set an even faster lap, ahead of the field by over 2.5 seconds. Petrucci commented, "I don't understand why the track was dry for Marc and wet for the rest of us." Márquez then took his 50th career MotoGP win, leading the race from start to finish.

Márquez also set pole in Austria and Silverstone, but lost out in two last-lap battles for victory to Dovizioso and Rins respectively. In Misano, where he did not set pole, he won the race after a last-lap showdown with rookie Fabio Quartararo. In Aragon he won commandingly from pole. His lead in the championship handed him match point in Thailand. After another thrilling last-lap battle with Quartararo, Márquez won the race and secured his eighth world championship with four rounds remaining.

Márquez closed out the season in commanding fashion. He took another victory from pole in Japan. He sat behind race leader Maverick Viñales for much of the race in Australia, before accelerating past him into the final lap. Under pressure to repass him, Viñales crashed, handing Márquez victory by eleven seconds. In Malaysia, Márquez injured his shoulder in qualifying, which would later require another post-season surgery, but recovered to finish second in the race. At the final race in Valencia, Márquez fittingly claimed his twelfth victory of the season. He fell one race short of the record for most wins in a single season that he had established in 2014. His final points tally was 420, giving him a 151-point advantage — the equivalent of six race wins — over second-placed Dovizioso.

===== 2020: The accident =====
During the 2020 preseason, Márquez signed a new deal with Honda, unusual in that it ran for four years instead of two and would therefore take Márquez off the riders' market until 2024. The season opener in Jerez was delayed due to the onset of the COVID-19 pandemic. Márquez qualified on the front row in third position. He quickly moved into the lead, but nearly crashed on Lap 5, dropping him down to sixteenth. The fastest man on track, and certainly not riding the fastest bike, Márquez charged back through the field and joined the battle for second place with five laps to go. Hervé Poncharal later commented, "I couldn't believe my eyes. Nobody has ever had that superiority, I think." Márquez then suffered a vicious highside at Turn 3, ending his race and breaking his right humerus.

Márquez underwent surgery to install a plate in his arm on 21 July. He then returned to Jerez for the Andalusian Grand Prix, due to be held five days later. He participated in free practice on Saturday, only to declare that he had too much pain in his recently injured arm to continue. He did not participate in another race in the 2020 season. The stress on his arm weakened the plate and caused it to break in August, necessitating another surgery. He then underwent a third surgery in December to receive a bone graft, which resulted in further complications due to infection.

===== 2021: Return to racing =====
Márquez missed the opening two races of the 2021 season due to his continued rehabilitation. He announced his return for the third round in Portugal, where he completed the race and finished within the points in seventh place. He also took a ninth-place finish in Jerez. Márquez then suffered three consecutive DNFs, in Le Mans, Mugello, and Catalonia. In Le Mans, where conditions were rainy, he had at one stage been leading the race.

Márquez qualified on the second row at his most reliable circuit, the Sachsenring. He got into the lead during the early laps of the race and held onto it to take his first Grand Prix victory in 581 days, and his 11th consecutive win in Germany. Márquez followed this result up with two point-scoring finishes at the Dutch and Styrian GPs. In Austria, he was battling in contention for the lead when he and the other top riders were forced to pit to change to rain tyres with three laps remaining. At the start of his first flying lap after leaving the pits, Márquez slid off the track. He remounted and finished fifteenth. At Silverstone, he collided with Jorge Martín on the opening lap and retired.

In Aragon, Márquez fought for victory with Francesco Bagnaia, but was unable to overpower Bagnaia's Ducati and ultimately settled for second place. He took fourth place in Misano. At his stomping ground in Texas, Márquez qualified on the front row, set the fastest lap, and secured his second victory of the season by over 4.5 seconds. He then claimed a consecutive victory at the Emilia Romagna GP. Márquez suffered a concussion in an off-road training session prior to the Algarve GP, and announced his withdrawal from the final two rounds of the season. He later admitted that the episode had brought on a recurrence of the diplopia which he had originally suffered back in 2011. Despite his truncated calendar, Márquez finished 7th in the championship. He had crashed a total of 22 times in 14 races.

===== 2022: Further surgery =====
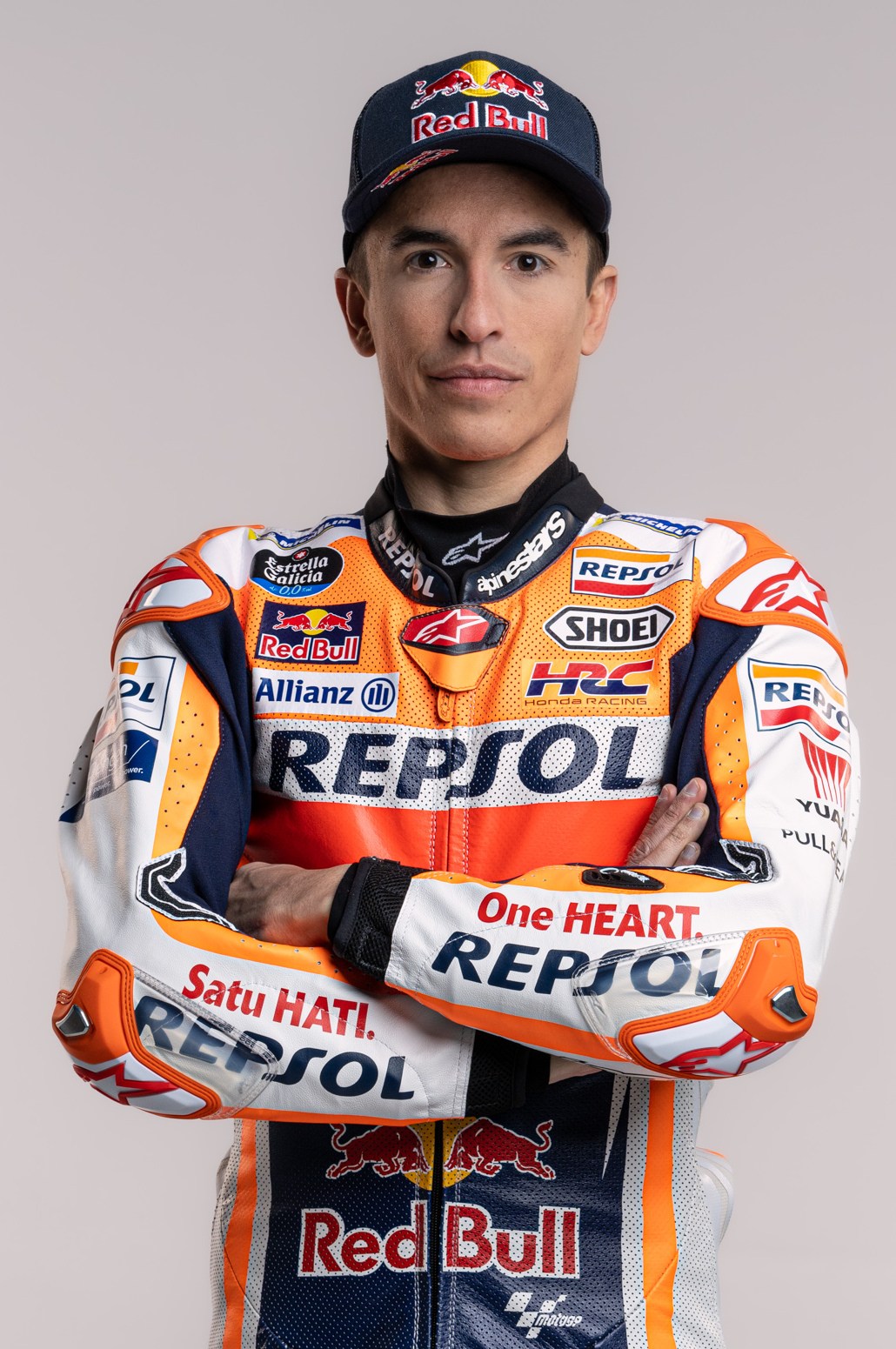
Márquez in 2022

Márquez was fit to compete at the first round of the 2022 season in Qatar, where he finished in fifth place. During practice for the second race of the season at Mandalika, Márquez crashed three times in practice. After a fourth crash, a violent highside during a warm-up session before the race, he was rushed to hospital. He was uninjured but declared unfit to race. After further checks in Spain he was diagnosed with a third episode of diplopia.

Márquez finished sixth in both Texas and Portugal, fourth in Spain, sixth again in France, and tenth at Mugello. After the qualifying sessions were concluded in Mugello, Márquez held a press conference to announce that he would undergo a fourth surgery on his right humerus at the Mayo Clinic to correct a 30-degree rotation of the bone. He was sidelined indefinitely, and replaced for all races by Honda test rider Stefan Bradl. Despite having missed five of 11 races, Márquez remained the top Honda rider in the standings going into the season's summer break.

Márquez returned to the grid at the fifteenth round of the season in Aragon. He had made up seven positions from his starting place when championship leader Quartararo crashed into the back of Márquez's bike, taking Quartararo out of the race. Debris from Quartararo's bike stuck in Márquez's wheel, causing him to collide with Takaaki Nakagami, and Márquez too retired from the race.

A week later, Márquez achieved the record-extending 91st pole position of his career in wet conditions in Japan. He had not taken pole in almost three years. He finished the race in fourth place. He recorded a fifth place finish in Thailand, then took his 100th MotoGP podium at Phillip Island, where he narrowly lost out on victory to Álex Rins. He finished seventh in Malaysia, and crashed out of Valencia. In spite of not starting eight of 20 races, Marquez finished the season in thirteenth place with 113 points, more than double that of any of his Honda stablemates.

===== 2023: Fracture with Honda =====
Márquez took his only pole position of 2023 at the season opener in Portugal. He also finished third in the first-ever MotoGP sprint race. However, in the main race, he crashed into Miguel Oliveira and received a double long-lap penalty to be served at the next race in Argentina. The crash left Márquez with a broken thumb that required surgery, and he withdrew first from Argentina, then from Texas, then from Spain. The FIM changed the wording of the penalty, ruling that it would instead be served at the next race Márquez was fit for. Honda challenged this decision, and the FIM Court of Appeal allowed for the penalty's annulment. Márquez returned in Le Mans, where he qualified in second. He managed to put himself into a battle for second with Jorge Martín, but crashed at Turn 7 on the penultimate lap. At Mugello, Márquez again qualified in second, and again crashed out of the race, while chasing Luca Marini for third place. He was the third Honda rider, following Álex Rins and Joan Mir, to be sidelined by a crash that weekend.

In Germany, Márquez hit the nadir of his MotoGP career. At a circuit he had not failed to win at since 2010, Márquez crashed five times across the weekend. The first of these crashes, during free practice, collected Johann Zarco in a terrifying incident that destroyed Zarco's bike, and from which both riders were lucky to walk away from relatively unscathed. After a particularly nasty wobble coming down the Ralf Waldmann Kurve in practice, Márquez appeared to stick his middle finger up in response to the vicious handling of his RC213V. A second crash occurred in the first qualifying session, and two more in the second. Márquez cruised to a limp eleventh place in the sprint race, for once unwilling to push his bike, before crashing again during the race morning warm-up and withdrawing from the event. Márquez also withdrew from Assen the following weekend, citing aggravation of the injuries he had sustained in Germany, which included a broken rib. At the first race after the summer break in Silverstone, despite riding with uncharacteristic caution, Márquez collided with Enea Bastianini and retired from the race.

Márquez finally ended his season-long streak of non-finishes at the Austrian Grand Prix, where he finished in twelfth place. He also finished the next three races, in Catalonia, Misano, and India. In Japan, Márquez qualified in seventh as the only Honda lapping fast enough for Q2. He then wrestled his Honda onto the podium in the main race, which was cut short due to extreme wet weather just as Márquez was hounding Bagnaia for second place. It was his first main race podium in nearly a year.

In the last six races of the season, Márquez retired twice, in Indonesia and Valencia, but finished races in Australia, Thailand, Malaysia, and Qatar. Márquez finished the season in fourteenth place. Despite his prolonged absences and failure to finish a Grand Prix until the ninth round, he still ranked as the top Honda in the standings, as his teammate Joan Mir and LCR rider Alex Rins battled their own injuries due to the now hugely uncompetitive and unpredictable RC213V. On 4 October 2023, Honda announced that they had prematurely terminated their contract with Márquez by mutual agreement.

==== Gresini Racing MotoGP (2024) ====
On 12 October 2023, it was announced that Márquez would race for the satellite Ducati team Gresini Racing for the 2024 season. He joined the team on a one-year contract, to be partnered by his younger brother Álex. Honda team manager Alberto Puig confirmed that Márquez would be allowed to ride a Ducati at the Valencian preseason test in November. Márquez finished the test ranked fourth in the standings after 49 laps.

===== 2024: Transition =====
Márquez started the season steadily, finishing fifth in the sprint and fourth in the race in Qatar. In Portugal, he finished second in his second sprint race on a Ducati. In the main race, Márquez and Bagnaia collided while fighting for fifth; Márquez remounted and finished sixteenth. At the Circuit of the Americas, Márquez claimed another second place in the sprint, but crashed out of the lead in the main race due to an apparent issue with his front brake.

In Jerez, Márquez claimed his 93rd pole position and first with Ducati. The sprint race turned into a battle of attrition which only sixteen of the 25 entrants finished. Márquez crashed out of the lead, but recovered to sixth. He duelled for the lead of the main race with reigning world champion Bagnaia. After finishing second, Márquez declared it the best podium of his career. At Le Mans, Márquez qualified a disappointing thirteenth, but fought his way through the grid to finish second in both races. This result sprang him to third place in the championship standings behind Bagnaia and Martín. In Catalonia, Márquez similarly qualified in fourteenth before finishing second in the sprint and third in the main race. At Mugello, he once again took second in the sprint. In the main race, he finished fourth, pushed off the podium by Bastianini in the last few laps.

Márquez endured a challenging weekend at Assen. He crashed out of the sprint and finished fourth in the main race before receiving a 16-second penalty for tyre-pressure infringement, demoting him to tenth. A heavy crash in practice at the Sachsenring left Márquez with a broken finger and contused ribs. He qualified in thirteenth but powered through the grid to second in the main race. His brother Álex finished third, and they became the first siblings to stand on a MotoGP podium together since 1997. Sprint DNFs and fourth place race finishes at both Silverstone and Austria saw Márquez slip to fourth in the championship standings, below Bastianini.

At Aragon, Márquez took his second pole of the season. He then took his first-ever sprint win, followed by his first race win with Ducati. It was his 60th victory in the premier class, and his first in 1,043 days. Márquez then took a consecutive victory at Misano, having also set the fastest laps at both circuits. He finished third at the Emilia Romagna GP. In Indonesia, Márquez had decent pace in practice, but failed to set a lap time in Q2 after crashing twice. Forced to start from twelfth on the grid, he fought his way up to third in the sprint. In the main race, a mechanical failure on lap 12 set his bike on fire and forced him to retire. In Japan, uncontrollable events led to Márquez starting from ninth on the grid, but he finished third in both the sprint and the main race.

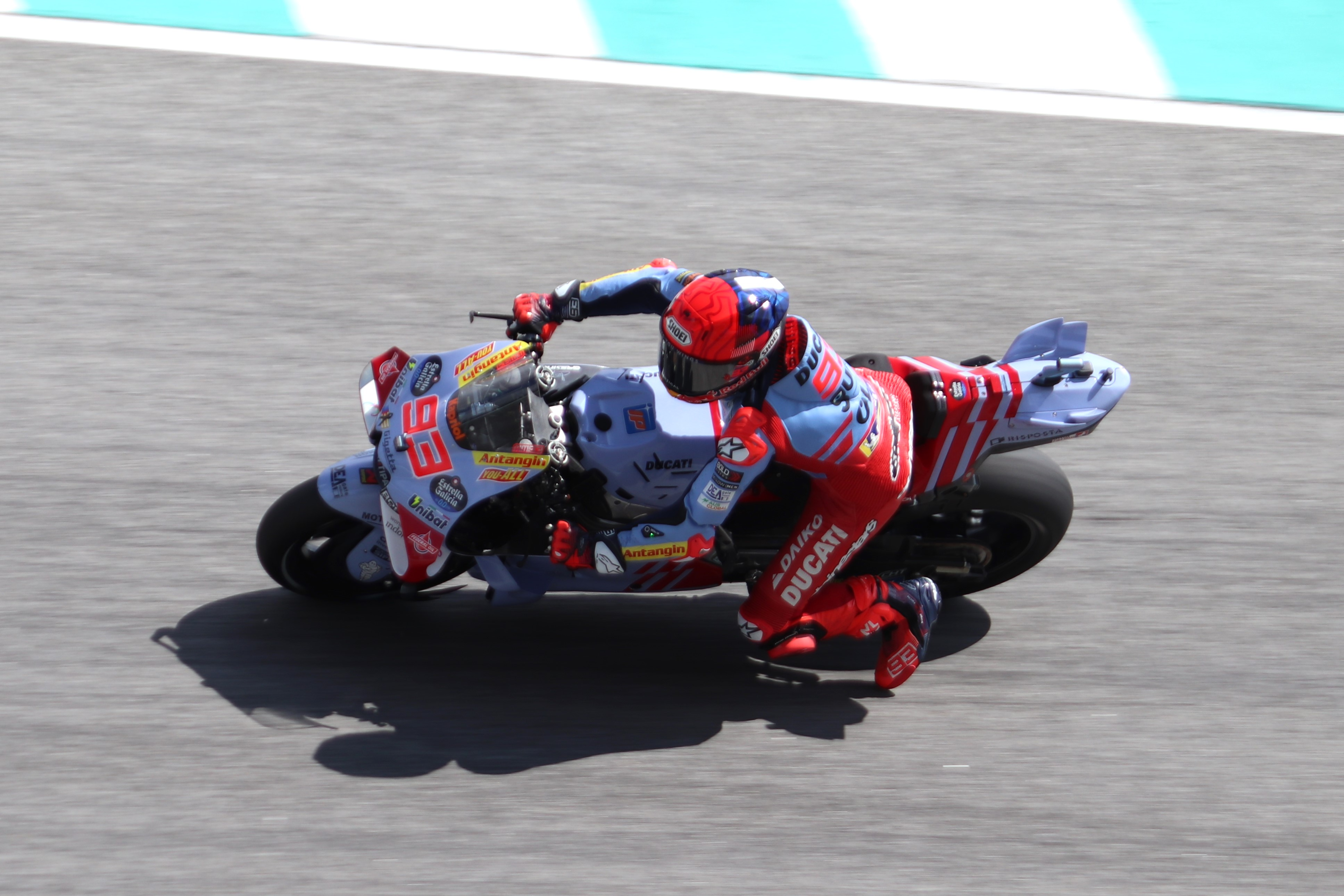
Márquez at the 2024 Malaysian Grand Prix

Márquez qualified in second at Phillip Island, but suffered a poor start after his helmet tear-off landed under his rear tyre. He fell back to thirteenth place, but recovered to sixth by the end of the first lap. He set a ferocious pace, breaking the circuit's race lap record on the seventh lap, and pulled into third position. He then overtook Bagnaia, on lap 12, and race leader Martín, in the final stages of the race, to claim his third win of the season. Márquez crashed while in the running for a podium place at both Buriram and Sepang. He remounted and finished both races in eleventh and twelfth place respectively. At the Solidarity GP, Márquez took second place despite struggling for pace during practice. He finished the season ranked third, his best championship placement since 2019.

==== Ducati Lenovo Team (2025–) ====
On 5 June 2024, it was announced that Márquez would join the factory Ducati team for the 2025 season on a two-year contract. This came as a surprise to some observers, as 2024 world champion Jorge Martín had already been promised the seat. There had been speculation over Márquez moving to the satellite Ducati team Pramac, but he publicly announced "Pramac is not an option." Ducati feared they might lose him to another manufacturer, and he was swiftly signed to the factory team. Martín then defected to Aprilia. Márquez made his debut on a factory Ducati bike at the post-season test in Barcelona, followed by encouraging tests in Sepang and Buriram.

===== 2025: The comeback =====
Márquez immediately reasserted his diminished authority over the grid. In the first two rounds in Thailand and Argentina, he took pole, won the sprint, set the fastest lap, and won the race. At the Circuit of the Americas, he seemed on course for this streak to continue, having taken both pole and won the sprint. The race was held in changeable conditions, and most riders had elected to start with wet tyres. On the starting grid, Márquez deliberately caused chaos by sprinting for his second bike minutes before the race start. Enough riders panicked and followed him that the race start was aborted. On its restart, Márquez powered into an early lead before crashing on the ninth lap. In Qatar, Márquez took pole, the sprint, the fastest lap, and his first race win at that circuit since his towering 2014 season. At Jerez, he won the sprint but crashed out of third in the race. Due to the crashes in Texas and Jerez, Márquez trailed his brother by one championship point before Le Mans. He recovered the lead there by winning the sprint, and finished second in the race. At Silverstone, Márquez failed to win the sprint, finishing second behind Álex. Ducati struggled in the main race. Márquez crashed out of the lead but was saved by a race restart due to an oil spillage on track. Upon the restart, Márquez's ailing teammate Bagnaia fell to the midfield and crashed out, and Álex finished fifth. Márquez salvaged third place, extending his championship lead.

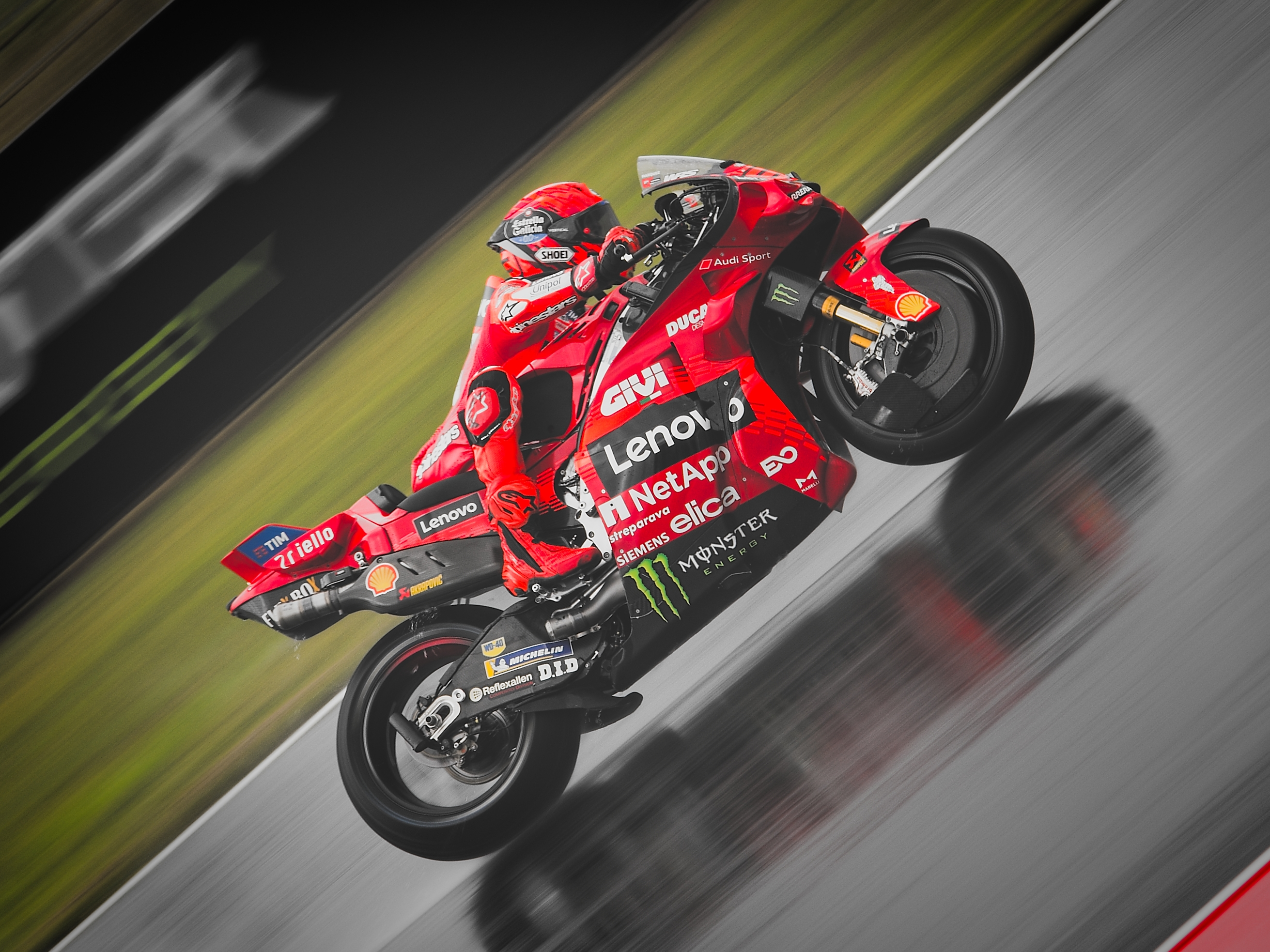
Márquez at the 2025 Czech Grand Prix

Márquez then began a seven-round winning streak across all sprints and main races. At Aragon, he topped every single session, becoming the first person to do so since himself at the 2015 German Grand Prix a decade earlier. Márquez took his 100th career pole and the sprint win in Mugello, where he had not won since 2014. He then won his 93rd race across all classes, after a hectic battle with his brother and Bagnaia in the early laps. At Assen, he qualified only fourth but won both the sprint (repelling an attack from his brother) and the race (repelling an attack from Marco Bezzecchi). At the Sachsenring, Márquez took pole and won the sprint. The main race was a battle of attrition which only 10 of the eighteen riders on track finished. Márquez won by six seconds, his twelfth win there across all classes. He overtook Giacomo Agostini for second in the list of premier class race winners. In Brno, after winning the sprint and race, Márquez became the first Ducati rider to win five MotoGP main races in a row.

After the summer break, Márquez took a career-first Grand Prix win in Austria, and won the sprint. He took a seventh consecutive double victory in Hungary, having fought off a challenge from Bezzecchi at both circuits. Márquez won his eighth consecutive sprint race in Catalonia but he was bested in the main race for the first time since Silverstone by his brother. In Misano, Márquez failed to finish a sprint for the first time all season, crashing to the applause of some Italians just after passing Bezzecchi for the lead. He recovered to win the main race on Sunday, securing his eleventh win of the season. On the podium, he took off his leathers in imitation of Lionel Messi's celebration in front of a hostile Real Madrid crowd. Márquez now had the opportunity to clinch the championship with five rounds remaining in Motegi. He duly rode conservatively to second place in both the sprint and the race. He secured his seventh MotoGP title, his ninth world title, and his first title in six years. This was the longest drought between titles any rider has experienced. He drew level on both MotoGP and world titles with his old enemy Valentino Rossi. At age 32, he was the oldest champion in the MotoGP era (and in 2013 had been the youngest).

At Mandalika, a distracted Márquez had to go through Q1 for the first time all season and qualified ninth on the grid. Bezzecchi crashed into him on the first lap, taking them both out of the race. Márquez suffered a right shoulder injury, and withdrew from the Australian and Malaysian rounds. After a conservative treatment plan failed, he underwent surgery and withdrew from the rest of the season, including preseason testing in Valencia. Márquez finished the season with a haul of 545 points, setting a record in the sprint era despite missing four rounds of racing. Ducati won the "Triple Crown", securing the Riders', Constructors', and Teams' World Championships due in major part to Márquez's performance. His brother finished as championship runner-up, and they became the first siblings to finish 1–2 in any class of the Grand Prix motorcycle racing World Championship.

===== 2026: Further injury =====
During the opening rounds of 2026, it became apparent that the Aprilia had overtaken Ducati as the best bike on the grid. Aprilia rider Marco Bezzecchi won the first three races of the season in Thailand, Brazil, and Austin. Márquez was on course to winning the sprint in Thailand until the last corner of the penultimate lap, where he nudged Pedro Acosta off the racing line with an aggressive block pass. Race Direction controversially ruled that Márquez had to cede position, so Márquez handed the lead back to Acosta and finished in P2. In the main race, Márquez suffered a rear tyre failure and retired. Márquez won the sprint in Brazil but was not on the main race podium. In Austin, Márquez qualified a lackluster sixth and finished the race in fifth after serving a long lap penalty. In Jerez, Márquez took pole and won his second sprint of the season, but crashed out of the main race.

The cause of Márquez's inconsistency became clear in Le Mans. After being sent to Q1, Márquez set a new lap record to get into Q2, where he qualified in second. He then suffered a violent highside on the penultimate lap of the sprint race, fracturing the fifth metatarsal of his right foot. He admitted he had received a medical check-up after the Jerez round, and had discovered that a screw from an old surgery was pressing on the radial nerve in his right arm during races. He had planned to undergo surgery after Catalonia, but due to the crash he withdrew from Le Mans and Catalonia to undergo a double surgery on his foot and shoulder. Márquez returned in Mugello, where he finished both races without incident.

At Balaton Park, Márquez claimed that the other riders would be doing something wrong if he was in contention for victory. He then took pole position, won the sprint race, and won the main race, aided by an early collision between several of his rivals. This was Márquez's first victory of the season, and his 100th win across all classes, as well as Ducati factory team's 100th win in MotoGP. At Brno, Márquez qualified on the second row and rode to a stunning consecutive victory. At Assen, a physically punishing circuit, Márquez finished an unremarkable 6th and 7th in the sprint and main race. In Germany, Márquez customarily took pole, won the sprint and main races, and set a new lap record. This was his 10th premier class victory at the Sachsenring and his 13th across all classes: he tied Giacomo Agostini's record for most premier class wins at a single circuit.

After summer break, the status of Márquez's long-suffering right arm was a topic of interest. At Silverstone, a circuit that favored neither Márquez nor Ducati, he finished ninth in the sprint after suffering a rear tyre issue, and seventh in the main race. Márquez was later filmed admitting to his team he had "no control" over his arm. In Aragon, Márquez won both the sprint and main race. This was his third consecutive double victory at Aragon, maintaining his 100% success rate there on Ducati machinery. Márquez subsequently posted a photo on social media which revealed atrophy in several muscles around his right shoulder and went viral. He said that he had published it to end the constant speculation over his health.

At Misano, Márquez again qualified second and pulled off a consecutive double victory. In Austria, Márquez finished second in the sprint and fifth in the main race after suffering a front brake problem which led him to consider retiring from the race. He regrouped in Japan to take his fifth double victory of the season, and became the rider with the most outright premier class wins at the Motegi Circuit (4). At Mandalika, where Márquez had never previously finished a main race, he won the sprint after two of the Aprilias crashed at the first corner, and finished the main race in sixth. At the final Australian GP at Phillip Island, Márquez crashed during a wet Q2 but swapped to his spare bike to set pole with a 1.494s margin. This was the most dominant pole margin since Márquez at the 2019 Czech GP. He won the sprint, but the main race was cancelled due to wet weather.

===== 2027: =====
For the 2027 season, Márquez will remain with Ducati after signing a two-year contract extension. He will partner Pedro Acosta, who is joining the factory team as his teammate.

== Riding style ==
=== Elbow-dragging ===
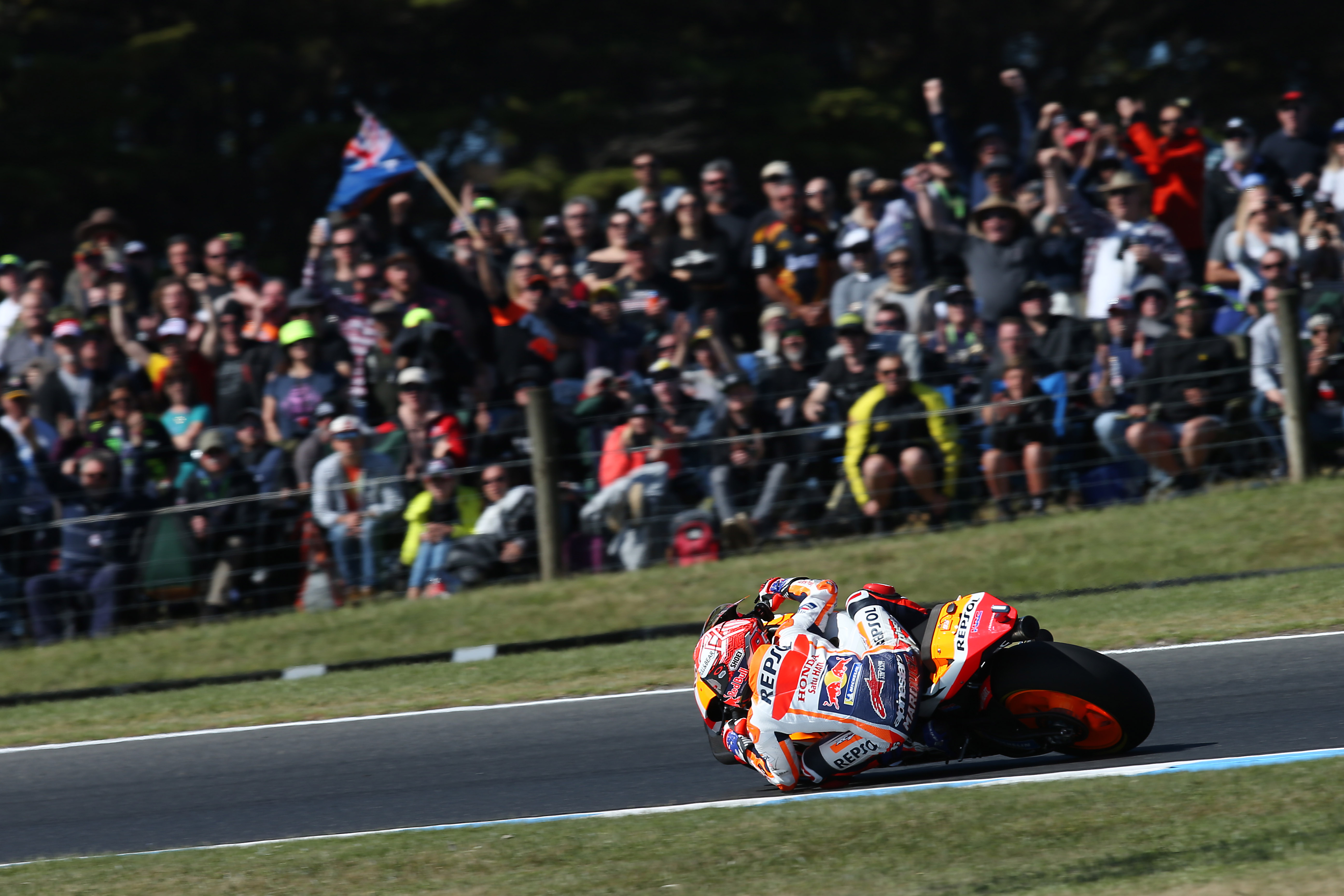
Márquez dragging his elbows during the 2018 Australian Grand Prix

Márquez brought a radical approach to handling a MotoGP bike when he joined the premier class in 2013. During his time in Moto2, he had discovered how to use his elbows as outriggers, dragging them along the ground through corners. This technique gave him more control, and allowed him to right the bike if he began to lose the front tyre. It became so popular that suit manufacturers began developing elbow sliders for every rider. Former riders including James Toseland, Cal Crutchlow, and Neil Hodgson have credited Márquez's technique with redefining motorcycle racing.

Márquez's unusual ability to save crashes has assisted him on many occasions – notably at the 2017 season finale in Valencia, where he slid completely off the circuit but righted his bike just before the gravel trap, allowing him to continue and seal his fourth MotoGP title. Márquez set the MotoGP lean angle record with a save from 70.8 degrees during the 2019 Australian GP.

=== Anti-clockwise circuits ===
Throughout his career, Márquez has shown an affinity for left corners and anti-clockwise circuits. Márquez's most successful circuit is the anti-clockwise Sachsenring, where he has been dubbed the "King of the Ring". He has won there thirteen times across all classes, equalling Giacomo Agostini's record for most premier class wins at a single circuit. One of his most impressive races there was in 2021, his first victory after his debilitating 2020 arm injury. Afterwards, Jack Miller quipped, "He smoked us with one arm!". After Márquez won his first race with Gresini Racing on the anti-clockwise MotorLand Aragón circuit, factory Ducati riders Francesco Bagnaia and Enea Bastianini revealed that Márquez was able to lean as much as 5 degrees further than them on left corners. Turn 10 at Aragón was dedicated to Márquez in 2018. Márquez's preference for left handers has become more marked in his late career due to repeated surgeries on his right arm.

=== Low-grip conditions ===
Márquez has also demonstrated a unique feel for riding in low-grip conditions. At the 2018 Austrian GP, when asked to draw his ideal track, Márquez drew a simple loop and wrote on it "Left corners and very slippery". He has a remarkable success rate in flag-to-flag races, where the weather oscillates between wet and dry, meaning the track lacks grip and tyre selection is critical. During qualifying at the 2019 Czech GP, Márquez famously kept riding on slick tyres despite rain falling across much of the track. He took pole 2.524 seconds ahead of the second-placed rider, the largest margin for a pole position in history. Danilo Petrucci commented, "I don't understand why the track was dry for Marc and wet for the rest of us."

== Other motorsport activities ==
=== Dirt biking ===
Márquez began his career racing in motocross as a child, and continues to use it as a regular training activity. He is also proficient in flat track racing. He headlined several editions of the Superprestigio Dirt Track, an invitational event revived in 2014. The first part of the event was split into two categories: the "Superprestigio" for road racers, and the "Open" category for dirt track racers. The top racers from each heat proceeded to a combined "Superfinal".

At the inaugural event, Márquez won the Superprestigio final but crashed out of the Superfinal. At the second event, Márquez once again led the Superprestigio category, and exacted revenge by winning the Superfinal, defeating reigning flat track champion Jared Mees by 0.289 seconds. He finished second in the Superfinal at the Superprestigio III behind flat track star Brad Baker, but took a second Superfinal victory at the Superprestigio IV, with Baker finishing in third.

=== Formula One test ===
Márquez has expressed limited interest in car racing, but uses karting as an occasional training activity. In 2018, he completed a Formula One test drive for Toro Rosso, driving the 2012 Red Bull RB8 for 43 laps at the Red Bull Ring in Austria.

== Personal life ==
Marc visited Pope Francis at the Vatican in 2018.

Márquez lived in his parents' hometown, Cervera, until 2022. He briefly made headlines in 2014 after Spanish media reported he was planning to move to Andorra, alleging it was for tax reasons. Márquez ultimately did not relocate until eight years later, when he moved to Madrid to seek better medical support for his injured right arm. His younger brother Álex lived with him in Madrid until he bought his own home nearby in 2026. Márquez has since stated that he has always been a Spanish resident for tax purposes, and that "it's right that those who have more pay more".

Marc and Álex have a close relationship, and are each other's regular training partners. In 2014, they became the first siblings to win world titles in the same season - Marc in MotoGP and Álex in Moto3. They repeated this feat in 2019, when Marc won MotoGP and Álex won Moto2. In 2025, when Marc won his seventh MotoGP title, Álex finished runner-up, and they became the first siblings to finish 1–2 in any class of the Grand Prix motorcycle racing World Championship. They have also been teammates in MotoGP on two occasions: at Repsol Honda in 2020 and at Gresini Racing in 2024.

In 2022, Marc and Álex founded the talent management agency Vertical in Madrid. Junior motorcycle racer Máximo Quiles became their first client, and both brothers continue to mentor and train with him. The agency represents a variety of athletes, artists, and content creators.

Márquez has been in a relationship with Spanish model Gemma Pinto Gasulla since 2023. In 2026 they adopted a dog named Turco.

Aside from his native languages, Catalan and Spanish, Márquez is a fluent speaker of English and Italian.

== In the media ==
=== Public image ===
As a teenager in the lower classes, Márquez drew attention both for his talent and for his knack for attracting controversy. Twice during his stint in Moto2, he received back-of-the-grid penalties for irresponsible riding in practice, but carved his way through the field to take a podium and a stunning comeback win. At the 2012 Qatar GP he overtook Thomas Lüthi aggressively on the final lap, and Lüthi slapped him on the arm in retaliation; both riders received warnings. Collisions with Pol Espargaró at Catalonia and Mika Kallio at Motegi, on which premier class riders were asked to comment, brought Márquez further notoriety. However, he remained a popular figure with fans and media. Upon his premier class debut, he was credited with increasing excitement in the sport, and was dubbed the "greatest personality to hit MotoGP since Rossi".

Following the events of the 2015 Malaysian GP, Márquez was subjected to intense criticism from Rossi's large fanbase. A petition demanding the cancellation of Rossi's penalty drew hundreds of thousands of signatures. Italian Prime Minister Matteo Renzi called Rossi to express his support, while Spanish Prime Minister Mariano Rajoy backed Márquez, writing that "in sport as in politics, not everything is permissible". Two reporters from the Italian television programme Le Iene subsequently went to Márquez's home in Cervera. Márquez's camp said they had entered the property and assaulted members of the family; the journalists said they themselves had been assaulted. Police were called to attend the scene. Nearly 100 members of the Valencian police were stationed at the 2015 Valencian GP, where Márquez and Jorge Lorenzo were both booed on the podium.

The tense atmosphere did not abate once the season ended. Márquez and Lorenzo both received additional security at the 2016 Italian GP due to concerns for their safety, although Márquez said it was unnecessary. Some spectators at the same event reportedly hung and burned an effigy wearing Márquez's #93, while others condemned the stunt. At the 2018 Italian GP, some Rossi supporters built a mock grave for Márquez at Mugello. A number of his fans also enthusiastically celebrated Márquez's crash in the sprint in Misano in 2025. After winning the main race, Márquez took off his leathers in imitation of Lionel Messi's celebration in front of a hostile Real Madrid crowd.

Márquez was not often injured during his early career despite his many crashes, and developed a reputation for apparent fearlessness. After 2015, Márquez's most notable on-track controversy was at the 2018 Argentina GP, where he incurred three separate penalties for irresponsible riding. Former rider Colin Edwards commented, "You're talking about putting your own self at risk, much less the guy you're running into – it's unbelievable." Lorenzo later commented, "His weakness is what made him so strong: he's fearless." After breaking his arm at Jerez in 2020, Márquez attempted to return to competition a mere four days later, which proved disastrous. He said nonetheless, "I slept well that night, because I had tried."

During the early 2020s there was widespread speculation about Márquez's retirement, and some observers, notably Wayne Gardner, suggested that he should indeed retire for the sake of his health. Márquez admitted in 2023 that he had considered it. He persevered, and his 2025 title, his first in six years, brought him a fresh wave of popularity. MotoGP reported a 12% growth in the global fanbase that season. Pedro Acosta deemed it "one of the greatest comebacks" in any sport and compared Márquez to Michael Jordan. Mick Doohan commented, "I'm not sure any other sportsman or sportswoman has been able to come back from an injury like he's had. For me, he's just a different breed."

=== Personal brand ===
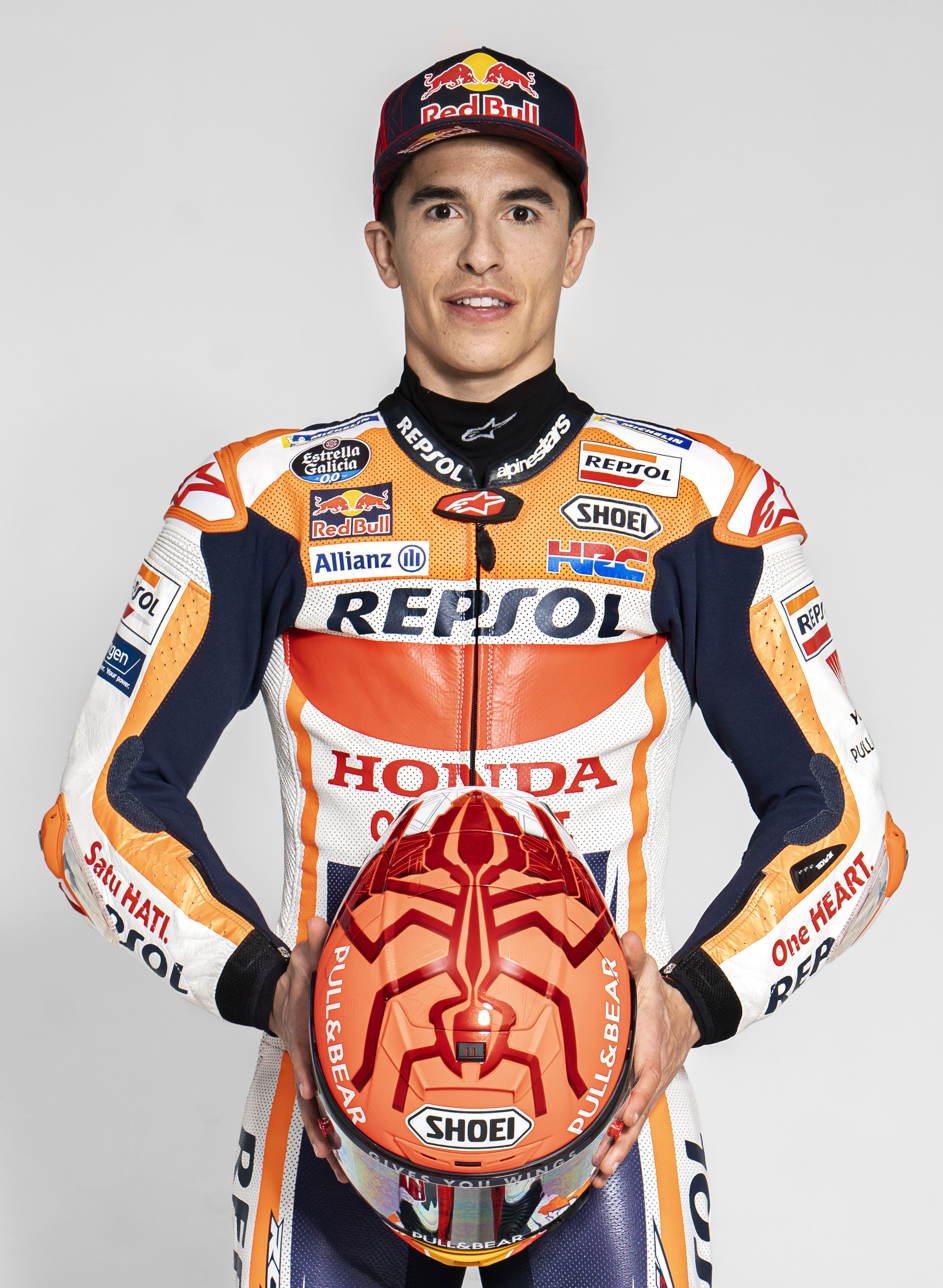
Márquez holding one of his ant motif helmets

Márquez rides with the racing number 93, chosen after his birth year. Although a world champion is entitled to race with a number 1 plate, Márquez has never used it during any of his reigns. When Márquez rode for Honda, his No. 93 was displayed with white text on a red background, on both his bike and official merchandise. Since his switch to Ducati, it is now displayed in red, outlined in black or white against the red bike. He used the slogan 'todo al rojo' ('all on red') to publicise his move to the factory Ducati team.

Márquez is nicknamed the 'Ant of Cervera' due to his height - he is 1.69 m (5 ft 6 1/2 in) tall. Since 2012, Márquez has used the ant as a motif on various gloves, helmets, and pit boards, as well as his official merchandise. He is also nicknamed 'el tro de Cervera' ('the thunder of Cervera') in his hometown. In 2023, Márquez launched WeAre93, his official fan club which has a dedicated grandstand at most races. His official merchandise is now sold under the same brand.

Márquez has celebrated several of his MotoGP championship victories with custom slogans. For his eighth world title in 2019, he used the slogan "#8ball", and during his celebrations sank an eight-ball into a pool table beside the race track. In 2025, Dorna announced plans to separate premier class title counts from titles in the lower classes. Márquez therefore did not celebrate his 2025 championship as either his ninth world title or his seventh in MotoGP, and instead used the slogan "More Than A Number".

=== Sponsorships ===
Márquez is sponsored by Italian motorsports equipment manufacturer Alpinestars, and has been sponsored by Japanese motorsports helmet manufacturer Shoei since 2010. He has been sponsored by Spanish beer brand Estrella Galicia 0,0 since 2011. His other commercial partners include German automobile manufacturer Audi, Spanish bike manufacturer Mondraker, Chinese camera company Insta360, American food brand Nesquik, and international security company Verisure under their Spanish division. Márquez's former personal sponsors include Spanish clothing brand Pull&Bear, Italian clothing brand Gas Jeans, Swiss watch manufacturer Tissot, and French skincare brand La Roche-Posay.

While he was a Honda rider, Márquez had a high-profile commercial relationship with energy drink brand Red Bull. This ended when he joined the factory Ducati team, whose principal sponsors include Red Bull's rival Monster Energy. Márquez declined to take on Monster as a new personal sponsor out of respect for Red Bull; Red Bull's association with Márquez's former team Honda was also paused at the time of his exit. Márquez's move to Ducati likewise ended his personal partnerships with tech company Samsung, insurance brand Allianz, and eyewear brand Oakley, which conflicted respectively with Ducati sponsors Lenovo, Unipol, and Carrera.

=== Documentaries ===
Márquez has been the subject of numerous biographies and documentaries. In 2013 Dorna Sports produced a feature-length documentary on his rookie season called Rookie #93 Marc Márquez: Beyond the Smile. In 2015, Márquez was one of six riders profiled in the Brad Pitt-narrated documentary Hitting the Apex, alongside Jorge Lorenzo, Valentino Rossi, Dani Pedrosa, Casey Stoner, and Marco Simoncelli. The documentary included coverage of Márquez's ascent to the premier class, his early controversies, and his path to winning the 2013 MotoGP championship.

Several more documentaries were produced about Márquez by his sponsors in the late 2010s. From Cervera to Tokyo documented his path to the 2016 title after a difficult preseason with Honda. Marc Márquez: Unseen documented his 2017 season. For his 2019 season, the five-part series Marc Márquez: Unlimited was released. In 2021, DAZN produced the four-part docuseries Route 46 - Route 93, which set Márquez's career alongside Valentino Rossi's and explored their rivalry.

In 2023, Márquez created a more personal documentary, titled Marc Márquez: All In. A five-part series by Prime Video, it detailed Márquez's struggles after his career-halting injury. Featuring appearances from MotoGP greats such as Lorenzo and Pedrosa, it also took a retrospective view of Márquez's early career and rivalries. In December 2025, DAZN released the documentary Volver to commemorate Márquez's comeback season. It included interviews with Spanish sports icons Rafael Nadal, Fernando Alonso, Pau Gasol, Alexia Putellas, and Andrés Iniesta.

== Career statistics ==
=== CEV Buckler 125cc Championship ===
==== Races by year ====
(key) (Races in bold indicate pole position, races in italics indicate fastest lap)

Year	Bike	1	2	3	4	5	6	7	Pos	Pts
2007	KTM	ALB1; 10	**CAT**; Ret	JER1; 1	VAL1; Ret	ALB2; DNS	VAL2; Ret	JER2; 8	9th	39

=== Grand Prix motorcycle racing ===
==== By season ====
Season	Class	Motorcycle	Team	Race	Win	Podium	Pole	FLap	Pts	Plcd	WCh
2008	125cc	KTM 125 FRR	Repsol KTM 125cc	13	0	1	0	0	63	13th	–
2009	125cc	KTM 125 FRR	Red Bull KTM Motorsport	16	0	1	2	1	94	8th	–
2010	125cc	Derbi RSA 125	Red Bull Ajo Motorsport	17	10	12	12	8	310	**1st**	1
2011	Moto2	Suter MMXI	Team CatalunyaCaixa Repsol	15	7	11	7	2	251	**2nd**	–
2012	Moto2	Suter MMX2	Team CatalunyaCaixa Repsol	17	9	14	7	5	328	**1st**	1
2013	MotoGP	Honda RC213V	Repsol Honda Team	18	6	16	9	11	334	**1st**	1
2014	MotoGP	Honda RC213V	Repsol Honda Team	18	13	14	13	12	362	**1st**	1
2015	MotoGP	Honda RC213V	Repsol Honda Team	18	5	9	8	7	242	**3rd**	–
2016	MotoGP	Honda RC213V	Repsol Honda Team	18	5	12	7	4	298	**1st**	1
2017	MotoGP	Honda RC213V	Repsol Honda Team	18	6	12	8	3	298	**1st**	1
2018	MotoGP	Honda RC213V	Repsol Honda Team	18	9	14	7	7	321	**1st**	1
2019	MotoGP	Honda RC213V	Repsol Honda Team	19	12	18	10	12	420	**1st**	1
2020	MotoGP	Honda RC213V	Repsol Honda Team	1	0	0	0	1	0	NC	–
2021	MotoGP	Honda RC213V	Repsol Honda Team	14	3	4	0	2	142	7th	–
2022	MotoGP	Honda RC213V	Repsol Honda Team	12	0	1	1	0	113	13th	–
2023	MotoGP	Honda RC213V	Repsol Honda Team	15	0	1	1	0	96	14th	–
2024	MotoGP	Ducati Desmosedici GP23	Gresini Racing MotoGP	20	3	10	2	4	392	**3rd**	–
2025	MotoGP	Ducati Desmosedici GP25	Ducati Lenovo Team	18	11	15	8	9	545	**1st**	1
2026	MotoGP	Ducati Desmosedici GP26	Ducati Lenovo Team	18	7	8	4	4	439*	**1st**	1
Total				**303**	**106**	**173**	**106**	**92**	**5048**		**10**

==== By class ====
Class	Seasons	1st GP	1st pod	1st win	Race	Win	Podiums	Pole	FLap	Pts	WChmp
125cc	2008–2010	2008 Portugal	2008 Great Britain	2010 Italy	46	10	14	14	9	467	1
Moto2	2011–2012	2011 Qatar	2011 France	2011 France	32	16	25	14	7	579	1
MotoGP	2013–present	2013 Qatar	2013 Qatar	2013 Americas	225	80	134	78	76	4002	8
Total	2008–present				**303**	**106**	**173**	**106**	**92**	**5048**	**10**

==== Races by year ====
(key) (Races in bold indicate pole position; races in italics indicate fastest lap; ^{superscript} indicates point-scoring sprint position)

Year	Class	Bike	1	2	3	4	5	6	7	8	9	10	11	12	13	14	15	16	17	18	19	20	21	22	Pos	Pts
2008	125cc	KTM	QAT	SPA; WD	POR; 18	CHN; 12	FRA; Ret	ITA; 19	CAT; 10	GBR; 3	NED; Ret	GER; 9	CZE; Ret	RSM; 4	INP; 6	JPN; Ret	AUS; 9	MAL; DNS	VAL						13th	63
2009	125cc	KTM	QAT; Ret	JPN; 5	SPA; 3	**FRA**; Ret	ITA; 5	CAT; 5	NED; 10	GER; 16	GBR; 15	CZE; 8	INP; 6	RSM; 4	POR; Ret	AUS; 9	**MAL**; Ret	VAL; 17							8th	94
2010	125cc	Derbi	**QAT**; 3	**SPA**; Ret	FRA; 3	ITA; 1	**GBR**; 1	**NED**; 1	**CAT**; 1	**GER**; 1	CZE; 7	**INP**; 10	RSM; 1	**ARA**; Ret	**JPN**; 1	**MAL**; 1	**AUS**; 1	POR; 1	**VAL**; 4						1st	310
2011	Moto2	Suter	QAT; Ret	SPA; Ret	POR; 21	FRA; 1	CAT; 2	**GBR**; Ret	NED; 1	**ITA**; 1	**GER**; 1	**CZE**; 2	**INP**; 1	RSM; 1	**ARA**; 1	**JPN**; 2	AUS; 3	MAL; WD	VAL; WD						2nd	251
2012	Moto2	Suter	QAT; 1	**SPA**; 2	**POR**; 1	**FRA**; Ret	**CAT**; 3	GBR; 3	**NED**; 1	**GER**; 1	ITA; 5	INP; 1	CZE; 1	**RSM**; 1	ARA; 2	JPN; 1	MAL; Ret	AUS; 2	VAL; 1						1st	328
2013	MotoGP	Honda	QAT; 3	**AME**; 1	SPA; 2	**FRA**; 3	ITA; Ret	CAT; 3	NED; 2	**GER**; 1	USA; 1	**INP**; 1	CZE; 1	**GBR**; 2	**RSM**; 2	**ARA**; 1	**MAL**; 2	AUS; DSQ	JPN; 2	**VAL**; 3					1st	334
2014	MotoGP	Honda	**QAT**; 1	**AME**; 1	**ARG**; 1	**SPA**; 1	**FRA**; 1	**ITA**; 1	CAT; 1	NED; 1	**GER**; 1	**INP**; 1	**CZE**; 4	**GBR**; 1	RSM; 15	**ARA**; 13	JPN; 2	**AUS**; Ret	**MAL**; 1	VAL; 1					1st	362
2015	MotoGP	Honda	QAT; 5	**AME**; 1	**ARG**; Ret	SPA; 2	**FRA**; 4	ITA; Ret	CAT; Ret	NED; 2	**GER**; 1	**INP**; 1	CZE; 2	**GBR**; Ret	RSM; 1	**ARA**; Ret	JPN; 4	**AUS**; 1	MAL; Ret	VAL; 2					3rd	242
2016	MotoGP	Honda	QAT; 3	**ARG**; 1	**AME**; 1	SPA; 3	FRA; 13	ITA; 2	**CAT**; 2	NED; 2	**GER**; 1	AUT; 5	**CZE**; 3	GBR; 4	RSM; 4	**ARA**; 1	JPN; 1	**AUS**; Ret	MAL; 11	VAL; 2					1st	298
2017	MotoGP	Honda	QAT; 4	**ARG**; Ret	**AME**; 1	SPA; 2	FRA; Ret	ITA; 6	CAT; 2	NED; 3	**GER**; 1	**CZE**; 1	**AUT**; 2	**GBR**; Ret	RSM; 1	ARA; 1	JPN; 2	**AUS**; 1	MAL; 4	**VAL**; 3					1st	298
2018	MotoGP	Honda	QAT; 2	ARG; 18	**AME**; 1	SPA; 1	FRA; 1	ITA; 16	CAT; 2	**NED**; 1	**GER**; 1	CZE; 3	**AUT**; 2	GBR; C	RSM; 2	ARA; 1	**THA**; 1	JPN; 1	**AUS**; Ret	**MAL**; 1	VAL; Ret				1st	321
2019	MotoGP	Honda	QAT; 2	**ARG**; 1	**AME**; Ret	SPA; 1	**FRA**; 1	**ITA**; 2	CAT; 1	NED; 2	**GER**; 1	**CZE**; 1	**AUT**; 2	**GBR**; 2	RSM; 1	**ARA**; 1	THA; 1	**JPN**; 1	AUS; 1	MAL; 2	VAL; 1				1st	420
2020	MotoGP	Honda	SPA; Ret	ANC; DNS	CZE	AUT	STY	RSM	EMI	CAT	FRA	ARA	TER	EUR	VAL	POR									NC	0
2021	MotoGP	Honda	QAT	DOH	POR; 7	SPA; 9	FRA; Ret	ITA; Ret	CAT; Ret	GER; 1	NED; 7	STY; 8	AUT; 15	GBR; Ret	ARA; 2	RSM; 4	AME; 1	EMI; 1	ALR	VAL					7th	142
2022	MotoGP	Honda	QAT; 5	INA; DNS	ARG	AME; 6	POR; 6	SPA; 4	FRA; 6	ITA; 10	CAT	GER	NED	GBR	AUT	RSM	ARA; Ret	**JPN**; 4	THA; 5	AUS; 2	MAL; 7	VAL; Ret			13th	113
2023	MotoGP	Honda	**POR**; Ret^{3}	ARG	AME	SPA	FRA; Ret^{5}	ITA; Ret^{7}	GER; DNS	NED; DNS	GBR; Ret	AUT; 12	CAT; 13	RSM; 7	IND; 9^{3}	JPN; 3^{7}	INA; Ret	AUS; 15	THA; 6^{4}	MAL; 13	QAT; 11	VAL; Ret^{3}			14th	96
2024	MotoGP	Ducati	QAT; 4^{5}	POR; 16^{2}	AME; Ret^{2}	**SPA**; 2^{6}	FRA; 2^{2}	CAT; 3^{2}	ITA; 4^{2}	NED; 10	GER; 2^{6}	GBR; 4	AUT; 4	**ARA**; 1^{1}	RSM; 1^{5}	EMI; 3^{4}	INA; Ret^{3}	JPN; 3^{3}	AUS; 1^{2}	THA; 11^{4}	MAL; 12^{2}	SLD; 2^{7}			3rd	392
2025	MotoGP	Ducati	**THA**; 1^{1}	**ARG**; 1^{1}	**AME**; Ret^{1}	**QAT**; 1^{1}	SPA; 12^{1}	FRA; 2^{1}	GBR; 3^{2}	**ARA**; 1^{1}	**ITA**; 1^{1}	NED; 1^{1}	**GER**; 1^{1}	CZE; 1^{1}	AUT; 1^{1}	**HUN**; 1^{1}	CAT; 2^{1}	RSM; 1	JPN; 2^{2}	INA; Ret^{6}	AUS	MAL	POR	VAL	1st	545
2026	MotoGP	Ducati	THA; Ret^{2}	BRA; 4^{1}	USA; 5	**SPA**; Ret^{1}	FRA; DNS	CAT	ITA; 7^{5}	**HUN**; 1^{1}	CZE; 1^{3}	NED; 7^{6}	**GER**; 1^{1}	GBR; 7^{9}	ARA; 1^{1}	RSM; 1^{1}	AUT; 5^{2}	JPN; 1^{1}	INA; 6^{1}	**AUS**; C^{1}	MAL; 1^{2}	QAT; 2^{1}	POR; 8	VAL	1st	439*

* Season still in progress.

== Records ==
As of the conclusion of round 20 of the 2026 season in Qatar, Márquez holds the following records:

Record	Number	Riders matched
Combined records (all classes)
Total pole positions	106	Stands alone
Wins at the Sachsenring	13 (2010–2019, 2021, 2025–2026)	Stands alone
Wins at Misano World Circuit	10 (2010–2012, 2015, 2017, 2019, 2021, 2024–2026)	Stands alone
Wins at MotorLand Aragón	9 (2011, 2013, 2016–2019, 2024–2026)	Stands alone
Wins at the Circuit of the Americas	7 (2013–2018, 2021)	Stands alone
Wins at Motegi Circuit	6 (2010, 2012, 2016, 2018–2019, 2026)	Stands alone
Wins at Indianapolis Motor Speedway	5 (2011–2015)	Stands alone
Wins at Autódromo Termas de Río Hondo	4 (2014, 2016, 2019, 2025)	Stands alone
Wins at Buriram International Circuit	3 (2018–2019, 2025)	Stands alone
Wins at Balaton Park Circuit	2 (2025–2026)	Mattia Casadei, Máximo Quiles
Consecutive wins at the Sachsenring	11 (2010–2019, 2021)	Stands alone
Consecutive wins at the Circuit of the Americas	6 (2013–2018)	Stands alone
Consecutive wins at Indianapolis Motor Speedway	5 (2011–2015)	Stands alone
Consecutive wins at MotorLand Aragón	4 (2016–2019)	Stands alone
Most pole positions at the same Grand Prix	12 (German Grand Prix), 9 (Aragon Grand Prix)	Stands alone
Most consecutive pole positions at the same Grand Prix	10 (German Grand Prix), 7 (Grand Prix of the Americas)	Stands alone
Most pole positions at the same circuit	12 (Sachsenring), 9 (MotorLand Aragón)	Stands alone
Most consecutive pole positions at the same circuit	10 (Sachsenring), 7 (Circuit of the Americas)	Stands alone
500cc/MotoGP records
Most wins in a season	13 (2014)	Stands alone
Most points in a season (pre-sprint era)	420 (2019)	Stands alone
Total pole positions	78	Stands alone
Total fastest laps	76	Valentino Rossi
Most pole positions in a season	13 (2014)	Stands alone
Most fastest laps in a season	12 (2014, 2019)	Valentino Rossi, Giacomo Agostini
Most poles and wins in the same race	47	Stands alone
Most poles, wins, and fastest laps in same race	34	Stands alone
Most "Grand Chelems"	12	Stands alone
Most wins in debut season	6 (2013)	Stands alone
Most pole positions in debut season	9 (2013)	Stands alone
Most fastest laps in debut season	11 (2013)	Stands alone
Most podium finishes in debut season	16 (2013)	Stands alone
Most points scored in debut season	334 (2013)	Stands alone
Best finishing position in debut season (not including 1949)	1st (2013)	Umberto Masetti, Kenny Roberts
Youngest race winner	2013 Americas GP (20 years, 63 days)	Stands alone
Youngest World Champion	2013 (20 years, 266 days)	Stands alone
Most races left in the season when becoming World Champion	5 (2025 in round 17 of 22)	Giacomo Agostini
Most points between first and second in the World Championship	151 (2019)	Stands alone
Overcome the largest points deficit to a championship leader	102 (2026)	Stands alone
Longest time between first and last World Championship titles	4,340 days (between 2013 and 2025)	Stands alone
Longest time between successive World Championship titles	2,184 days (between 2019 and 2025)	Stands alone
Largest pole margin	2.524 seconds (at 2019 Czech GP)	Stands alone
Most podium finishes in a season	18 (2019)	Stands alone
Championship titles with Honda	6 (2013–2014, 2016–2019)	Stands alone
Most wins with Honda	59	Stands alone
Consecutive wins with Honda	10 (Qatar–Indianapolis 2014)	Mick Doohan
Consecutive wins with Ducati	7 (Aragon–Hungary 2025)	Stands alone
Consecutive podiums with Ducati	12 (France–Japan 2025)	Stands alone
Riders' Championships won with most constructors	2 (Honda, Ducati)	Geoff Duke, Giacomo Agostini, Eddie Lawson, Valentino Rossi, Casey Stoner
Wins at the Sachsenring	10 (2013–2019, 2021, 2025–2026)	Stands alone
Wins at MotorLand Aragón	8 (2013, 2016–2019, 2024–2026)	Stands alone
Wins at Circuit of the Americas	7 (2013–2018, 2021)	Stands alone
Wins at Misano World Circuit	7 (2015, 2017, 2019, 2021, 2024–2026)	Stands alone
Wins at Brno Circuit	5 (2013, 2017, 2019, 2025–2026)	Valentino Rossi
Wins at Autódromo Termas de Río Hondo	4 (2014, 2016, 2019, 2025)	Stands alone
Wins at Motegi Circuit	4 (2016, 2018–2019, 2026)	Stands alone
Wins at Indianapolis Motor Speedway	3 (2013–2015)	Stands alone
Wins at Buriram International Circuit	3 (2018–2019, 2025)	Stands alone
Wins at Balaton Park Circuit	2 (2025–2026)	Stands alone
Consecutive wins at the Sachsenring	8 (2013–2019, 2021)	Stands alone
Consecutive wins at Circuit of the Americas	6 (2013–2018)	Stands alone
Consecutive wins at MotorLand Aragón	4 (2016–2019)	Stands alone
Consecutive wins at Indianapolis Motor Speedway	3 (2013–2015)	Stands alone
Most wins in the same Grand Prix	10 (German Grand Prix)	Giacomo Agostini, (Finnish Grand Prix)
Most wins in the same circuit	10 (Sachsenring)	Giacomo Agostini, (Imatra Circuit)
Most pole positions at the same Grand Prix	9 (German Grand Prix), 8 (Grand Prix of the Americas)	Stands alone
Most consecutive pole positions at the same Grand Prix	7 (Grand Prix of the Americas, German Grand Prix)	Stands alone
Most pole positions at the same circuit	9 (Sachsenring), 8 (Circuit of the Americas)	Stands alone
Most consecutive pole positions at the same circuit	7 (Circuit of the Americas, Sachsenring)	Stands alone
Moto2 records
Most wins	16	Stands alone
Most wins in a single season	9	Stands alone
Most podium finishes in a single season	14	Tito Rabat, Johann Zarco, Pedro Acosta
125cc records
Most pole positions in a single season	12	Stands alone

Other miscellaneous records held by Márquez include:

1. Premier class (MotoGP/500cc):

- Youngest rider to win 2, 3, 4, 5, and 6 premier class titles
- Youngest rider to lead the championship (20 years, 63 days)
- Youngest rider to win consecutive premier class titles (21 years, 237 days)
- Youngest rider to take 12 pole positions in a single season in premier class (21 years, 243 days)
- Four successive podium positions in first four race starts (shared with Max Biaggi)
- First rookie and youngest rider to take four consecutive pole positions (Silverstone–Malaysia 2013)
- First rookie and youngest rider to win four consecutive races (Germany–Brno 2013)
- Only Spanish rider to win 2 titles back-to-back in the premier class (2013–2014)
- Only Spanish rider to win 4 titles back-to-back in the premier class (2016–2019)
- Most World Championships by a Spanish rider in the premier class: 7
- Youngest rider to win 5, 6, 7, 8, 9, and 10 consecutive races in the premier class (2014)
- Youngest rider to win 11 and 12 races in a single season in the premier class (2014)
- Most consecutive race wins in a single season: 10 in 2014 (shared with Mick Doohan and Giacomo Agostini)
- First Ducati rider to win opening round season in his debut season (shared with Casey Stoner)
- First Ducati rider to win first 2 races (back-to-back) from opening round season in his debut season
- First Ducati rider to win World Championship in his debut season (shared with Casey Stoner)
- First rider ever to win 7 consecutive Grands Prix with two different manufacturers (Honda in 2014 and Ducati in 2025)
- The greatest ever comeback in MotoGP/Premier Class history
- Most BMW M Awards for Best Qualifier: 8 (2013–2019, 2025)
- Most consecutive BMW M Awards for Best Qualifier: 7 (2013–2019)

2. Four-stroke MotoGP era (2002–):

- Oldest rider to win a MotoGP World Championship (32 years, 223 days)
- Most races wins in MotoGP: 80
- Most consecutive wins in the same Grand Prix: 8 (German Grand Prix)
- Most consecutive wins in the same circuit: 8 (Sachsenring)
- Most consecutive MotoGP race wins: 10 (Qatar–Indianapolis 2014)
- Most pole positions from start of season: 6 (Qatar–Mugello 2014)
- Most races left in the season when becoming World Champion: 5

3. MotoGP sprint era (2023–):

- Most combined races & sprint races won in a single season: 25 of 44 races (2025) (Note: Márquez missed eight races of the season.)
- Most consecutive double victories (sprint & race): 7 (2025 Aragon GP–2025 Hungary GP)
- Most consecutive sprint wins: 8 (2025 Aragon GP–2025 Catalan GP)
- Most double victories in a single season: 10 (2025)
- Most sprint race wins in a season: 14 (2025)
- Most consecutive combined race & sprint race wins: 15 (Aragon sprint–Catalan sprint 2025)
- Most sprint race wins: 25
- Most sprint race podiums: 43
- Most sprint race fastest lap: 21
- Most points in a season: 545 (2025)

4. Alongside Álex Márquez:

- Only siblings to win World Championships in the same season (2014, 2019)
- First ever pair of siblings to be Grand Prix race winners (completed by Álex in 2013)
- First ever pair of siblings to win Grand Prix races on the same day (completed by Álex in 2014)
- First ever pair of siblings to be premier class race winners (completed by Álex in 2025)
- First ever pair of siblings to finish 1–2 in consecutive MotoGP races (MotoGP Thailand 2025 & MotoGP Argentine 2025)
- First ever pair of siblings to finish 1–2 in qualifying, sprint, warm up, and main race (MotoGP Thailand 2025 & MotoGP Argentine 2025)
- Finished 1–2 in ten consecutive sprint races (Thailand–Assen 2025)
- Only siblings to finish 1–2 in the history of the MotoGP/Premier Class championship standings (2025)
- Only siblings to place 1–2 in BMW M Awards qualifying (2025)
- Most qualifying sessions with brothers finishing 1–2: 7
- Most qualifying sessions with brothers both finishing in the top three: 13
- Most races finished 1–2 by siblings: 14 (sprint races only)
- Most races finished 1–2 by siblings: 7 (main races only)
- Most races finished 1–2 by siblings: 21 (sprint and main races combined)
- Most shared podiums by siblings: 14 (sprint races only)
- Most shared podiums by siblings: 10 (main races only)
- Most shared podiums by siblings: 24 (sprint and main races combined)

5. Across all Grand Prix classes:

- Youngest rider to win five consecutive races (Mugello–Sachsenring 2010)
- Most wins as a teenager in all classes: 26
- First rider to win intermediate and premier class titles back-to-back
- Youngest rider to win at least one race in all three main classes (125cc/Moto3, 250cc/Moto2, 500cc/MotoGP)
- Youngest Spanish rider to take a podium (15 years, 126 days)
- Youngest Spanish rider to take a pole position (16 years, 88 days)
- Youngest rider to win 3, 4, 5, 6, 7, and 8 championship titles
- Youngest rider to achieve 50 wins (22 years, 243 days)
- Youngest rider to achieve 60 wins (24 years, 219 days)
- Youngest rider to achieve 70 wins (25 years, 260 days)
- Youngest rider to achieve 80 wins (26 years, 245 days)
- First rider to claim pole position after taking part in Qualifying 1 (Thailand 2018)
- First and only rider to lead all sessions of a GP weekend (Germany 2015, repeated at Aragon 2025)
- First ever rider in Grand Prix motorcycle racing history to win World Championship after a drought of more than five years (from 2019 to 2025)
- Only siblings to win Grand Prix motorcycle racing World Championships in the same season (2014, 2019)
- First ever pair of siblings to be Grand Prix race winners (completed by Álex in 2013)
- First ever pair of siblings to win Grand Prix races on the same day (completed by Álex in 2014)
- First ever pair of siblings to finish 1–2 in consecutive Grand Prix motorcycle races (MotoGP Thailand 2025 & MotoGP Argentine 2025)
- Only siblings to finish 1–2 in the history of the Grand Prix motorcycle racing championship standings (2025 MotoGP)

== Awards and nominations ==
Name of award ceremony, year presented, category, nominee, and result of nomination
Award ceremony	Year	Category	Nominee / Work	Result	Ref.
Laureus World Sports Awards	2014	Breakthrough of the Year	Marc Márquez	Won	
Laureus World Sports Awards	2015	Sportsman of the Year	Marc Márquez	Nominated	
Laureus World Sports Awards	2020	Sportsman of the Year	Marc Márquez	Nominated	
Laureus World Sports Awards	2022	Comeback of the Year	Marc Márquez	Nominated	
Laureus World Sports Awards	2025	Comeback of the Year	Marc Márquez	Nominated	
Laureus World Sports Awards	2026	Sportsman of the Year	Marc Márquez	Nominated	
Premios Nacionales del Deporte	2014	Sportsman of the Year	Marc Márquez	Won	
Premios Nacionales del Deporte	2025	Sportsman of the Year	Marc Márquez	Won	

== See also ==
- List of career achievements by Marc Márquez

== Bibliography ==
- Márquez, Marc (30 October 2014). Marc Márquez: Dreams Come True: My Story. Ebury Press. ISBN 978-1473521360.
- Barker, Stuart (8 May 2025). Marc Márquez: Everything or Nothing: The Definitive Biography of MotoGP's Superstar. John Blake. ISBN 978-1789468298.
