= Jaime Alguersuari Sr. =

Spanish motorcycle racer

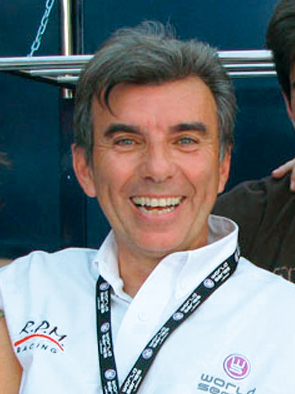
- Jaime Alguersuari
- Born: April 2, 1950 (age 76); Barcelona, Spain
- Children: 2, including Jaime
Motorcycle racing career statistics
50cc World Championship
Active years	1973, 1975
Manufacturers	Derbi
Starts / Wins / Podiums / Poles / F. laps / Points; 2 / 0 / 0 / 0 / 0 / 8

Jaime Alguersuari Tortajada (Spanish pronunciation: [ˈxajme alɣeɾˈswaɾi]; also known as Jaime Alguersuari Sr., born April 2, 1950, in Barcelona, Spain), is a Spanish former Grand Prix motorcycle racer. He is the father of ex-Formula One driver Jaime Alguersuari.

Alguersuari won the 250 cc category at the 1972 Bol d'Or at Le Mans on a Montesa.

In 1975, Alguersuari and his brother José Maria founded the Solo Moto magazine. Through his companies Alesport and RPM, he invented indoor trial and endurocross with events at the Palau Sant Jordi in Barcelona. In addition to motorcycling events, RPM has organized the World Series by Renault, the Barcelona Marathon, the Spanish stages of the Rally Dakar, and the Superprestigio Dirt Track.

== Motorcycle Grand Prix results ==
(key) (Races in bold indicate pole position; races in italics indicate fastest lap)

Year	Class	Team	1	2	3	4	5	6	7	8	Points	Rank
1973	50cc	Derbi	GER	NAT; 7	YUG	NED	BEL	SWE	ESP		4	16th
1975	50cc	Derbi	ESP; 7	GER	NAT	NED	BEL	SWE	FIN	YUG	4	18th
