= Teenybopper =

Young teenager who follows adolescent trends in music, fashion, and culture

A teenybopper is a young teenager, typically a girl, who follows adolescent trends in music, fashion, and culture. The term may have been coined by marketing professionals and psychologists, later becoming a subculture of its own. The term was introduced in the 1950s to refer to teenagers who mainly listened to popular music and/or rock and roll and not much else. Teenybopper became widely used again in the late 1960s and early 1970s, following an increase in the marketing of pop music, teen idols and fashions aimed specifically at younger girls, generally 10–15 years old.

== Musical preferences ==
In the 1960s, a new type of music appeared, different from the Tin Pan Alley music school, but molded by it. It was no longer written by the old established songwriters of Tin Pan Alley, but by young people. They helped to establish the new teen idols and wrote the so-called "teeny bopper songs", which "blend soft rock with pop ballad".

Tiger Beat fan magazine's content was "guys in their 20s singing 'La La' songs to 13-year-old girls." Similar magazines include Bop, 16, and Modern Teen.

The media and music content preferred by adolescent females differ from that preferred by sexually mature females.

The difference that the 70s' "Teeny Bopper syndrome" had with prior idol phenomena was that these new teen idols were directed at even younger girls, down to 15 years old, who were too young to have heard the Beatles and were not attracted to the new hard rock music of the time that their elder siblings listened to. This new market has a quick turnover potential and it boosted the benefits of many broadcasting companies.

The teenybopper idol image is that of the young boy next door, with "girlish" looks and singing about longing for romance. Their music is consumed by young girls, who collect posters and pin ups.

== See also ==
- Adolescence
- Tween
- Bobby soxer
- Bubblegum pop
- Teen pop
- Disney Channel
- Nickelodeon
- Yé-yé
