= Chicano Roy =

American motorcycle builder and inventor

Roy Suarez Garcia (1945–2003) AKA "Chicano Roy" was an American motorcycle builder and inventor. He is credited with developing the idea of molding shapes and designs from the frame to the gas tank, and he designed the first pop-off gas tank, a significant improvement for motorcycle safety and repair.

From 1977 to 1982, Chicano Roy was the first Hispanic motorcycle chopper builder to conquer the custom motorcycle magazine world, with his right-hand man, and youngest brother of 10, David Garcia. These magazines included Easyrider, Big Bike, Street Chopper, Custom Bike, Chopper, Iron Horse and others. Chicano Roy was the first to invent items, including, but not limited to, the "Molded Frame", which is a motorcycle frame that has the gas tank and frame molded together to look as one, to give body to the entire skeleton frame; however, the gas tank actually un-bolted just in case the gas tank was damaged in an accident. Chicano Roy molded all types of motorcycle frame from stock to after-market to complete personal fabricated frames. Chicano Roy and Lil brother David also included in their arsenal of customizing the "Frenched Spoon Seat", where the seat actually sat inside the frame, so you did not see a separation in between the frame and the seat. Laminations between the seat and the gas tank or recessed in the gas tank. Plus "The Frenched Axle", where the large ugly back-wheel axle nuts did not protrude outward anymore; rather, they recessed flush with the new body of the frame; extreme front and back leg peaking.

In 1980, Custom Bike magazine featured a four-page article called "The Art of Molding" which indicates, "The bolt-on or pop-off gas tank --a big feature of the molded frame -- didn't come along until Chicano Roy". All of these styles are still being used by some of the world's greatest chopper builders of today.

In 1968, Roy was with his eldest brother Eddie Garcia AKA Gypsy (engine builder and race car driver) who had the first Harley Davidson (1948 Panhead) in the Garcia Family. Gypsy tore down the Panhead, Roy molded his first frame, his brother Gypsy's Panhead frame. This was not the pop-off gas tank yet, the gas tank was welded onto the frame and then molded, this was the old approach. Gypsy ran all his wiring inside the stock Panhead frame which gives a cleaner look which was not being done at that time. In 1970 Chicano Roy molded his first Molded pop-off gas tank frame on his own Pan-Shovelhead (Gypsy built motor) Chopper at his home in San Fernando, California. Note: in this time frame Brother (artist) Johnny Garcia AKA Oso, would draw the two older brothers "Chopper" concepts w/extreme detail. Easyrider re-issued a chopper that had been molded by Chicano Roy and brother David Garcia as they worked out of a motorcycle shop called "Two Broke Tramps" in San Fernando, California. The chopper was epoxy painted by Raja, owner of Chopper Specialties in Orange County, California and assembled by Two Broke Tramps. Raja used different butterscotch tints of color plus gold / silver metal flake for base color and masterful custom metal flake pinstriping. The Chopper was featured in 1978 then re-issued in Easyriders 1903-2003 Harley-Davidson's First One Hundred Years History Magazine to represent when Harley-Davidsons were first being ["chopped"] -- customized beyond the "Bobber" look.
