= Indian Scout FTR750 =

Competition-only motorcycle engine

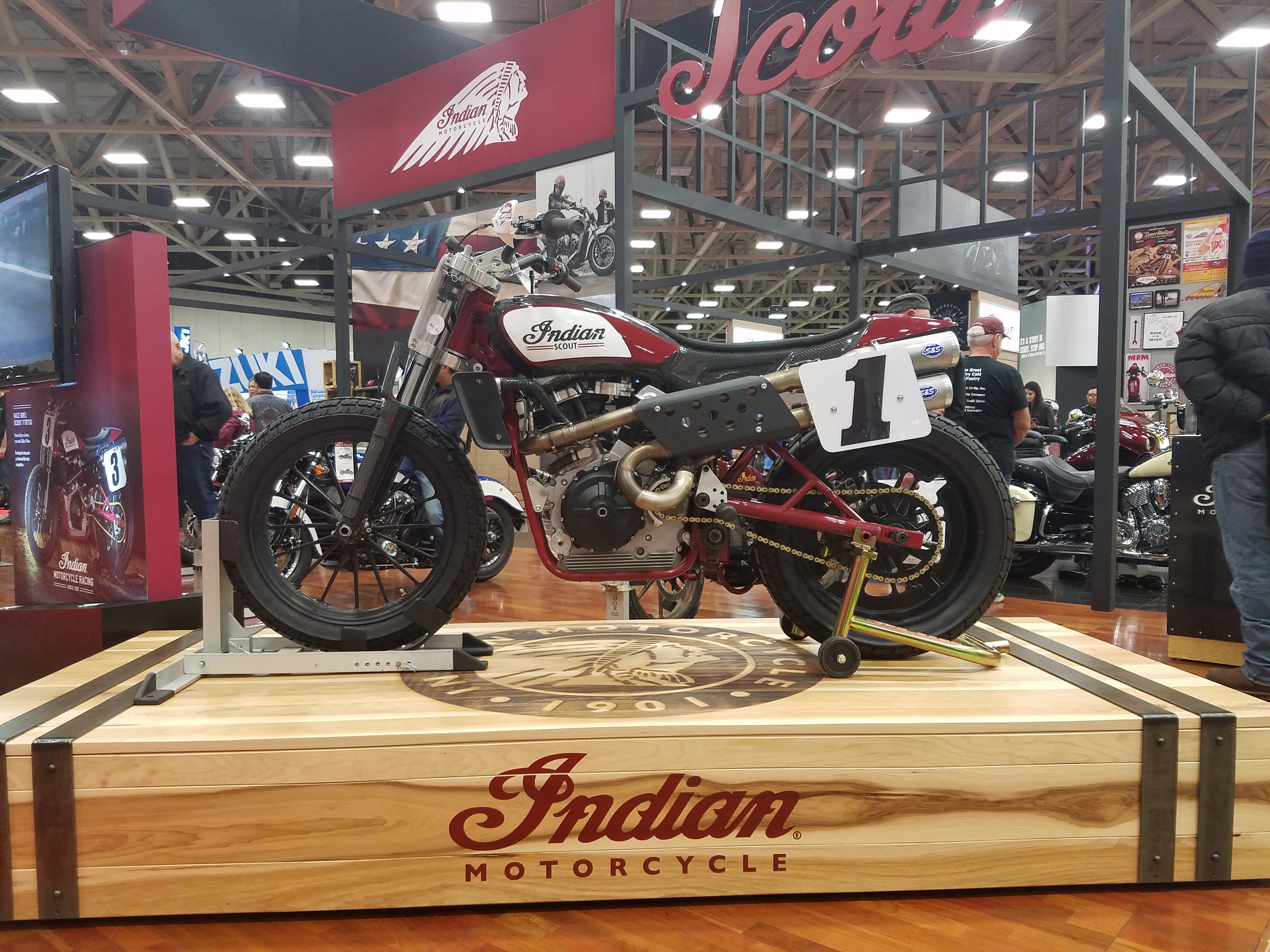
- Manufacturer: Indian Motorcycle/Swissauto
- Also called: Race 750
- Class: Dirt track racing
- Engine: 748 cc (45.6 cu in) liquid cooled 53°-V-twin, single injector per cylinder
- Bore / stroke: 88 mm × 61.5 mm (3.46 in × 2.42 in)
- Transmission: 4-speed sequential manual transmission, chain-final-drive

The Indian Scout FTR750 is a competition-only motorcycle engine made by Indian Motorcycle for flat track racing. It is a fuel-injected, liquid-cooled, four-valve-per-cylinder V-twin. A single-pin crankshaft riding on plain bearings carries side-by-side steel connecting rods. It is the first all-new flat track racing motor from Indian Motorcycle in decades.

== Competition ==
Indian Scout FTR750 as raced by Brad Baker at the Sturgis TT August 6, 2017.

On June 14, 2016 Jared Mees announced that he will join Indian as their flat track test rider. On September 6, 2016, Joe Kopp was announced as the first rider to race the FTR750 at the upcoming Santa Rosa Mile in Santa Rosa, California on September 25, 2016. The FTR750 was slated to be used in GNC1 competition in AMA Pro Flat Track racing full-time in 2017.

== Street-legal motorcycle ==
Indian marketed the FTR1200 as a street-legal rendition of the FTR750. They have some appearance similarities including a steel trellis frame and trellis swingarm.
