= Iron Horse (magazine) =

Motorcycling magazine

- Categories: Motorcycling
- Publisher: Paisano Publications, LLC; Dell Publishing Co. (original)
- Founder: Lou Kimzey
- Founded: 1978; 48 years ago
- Final issue: 2011; 15 years ago
- Country: United States
- Based in: New York, NY
- Language: English

Iron Horse, sometimes written Ironhorse, was a motorcycling magazine dedicated to biker culture, published between 1979 and 2011.

Originally a spin-off of Easyriders, it was meant to showcase a broader range of bikes than the Harley-Davidson and Indian models that were the focus of its sister publication.

== History ==
Iron Horse's maiden issue was dated January 1979. The magazine was co-published by Paisano and Dell until the mid-1980s when it was sold to the Traub family, the owners of a New York area printing plant and publishers of many special interest titles, ranging from romance novels to men's magazines.

Iron Horse enjoyed its creative heyday during the early 1990s under editor-in-chief Dave Snow and Assistant editor Fritz Schenck, but that did not prevent its sale — along with several other Traub properties — to Princeton Publishing, the New York subsidiary of a fast expanding Florida-based startup, in 1996.
Snow and Fritz departed in April 1997. The magazine suspended publication soon after, amidst the collapse of its debt-ridden parent company.

It was eventually acquired by one of the Traubs' daughters, and relaunched in late 2005. Snow and Fritz were brought back in May 2006 in an attempt to lure readers, but this second stint was shorter-lived, and editor-at-large Todd Ingram carried the publication for the remainder of its run. Iron Horse's final issue was published in November 2011.

FX's popular biker-themed series Sons of Anarchy was a frequent topic in later years, with star Ron Perlman appearing in interview and on the cover of the December 2009 issue.

== Spiritual successor ==
In 1999, while Iron Horse was on hiatus, a spiritual successor called The Horse: Backstreet Choppers was launched by a group of former employees headed by Janus. It is still published.
