= Joe Kopp =

American motorcycle racer

- Born: May 11, 1969 (age 57); Spokane, Washington, United States
- Current team: Latus Motors Ducati
- Bike number: 3

Joe Kopp is an American motorcycle racer. He has competed in the AMA Pro Flat Track Racing Championship since 1993, winning the AMA Pro Grand National Championship in 2000.

== AMA Pro Flat Track ==
Kopp is one of 15 riders to complete the Dirt Track "Grand Slam"—victories on short track, TT, half-mile, and mile courses. In addition to his 2000 AMA Grand National Championship, he earned the 1999 and 2000 AMA 600 Hotshot and Supertracker Championships.

== F-USA Dirt Track ==
Kopp raced Clear Channel's F-USA Dirt Track series in 2002 and 2003, winning the 2002 Plymouth, Wisconsin Short Track on a KTM.

== AMA Pro Supermoto Championship ==
Kopp raced in the AMA Supermoto Championship in 2003 with the HMC KTM Team. He qualified for a chance at the championship by being one of the 74 riders who qualified for the winner-take-all final.

== Pikes Peak International Hill Climb ==
Kopp competed in the 2011 Pikes Peak International Hill Climb on a Team Latus Triumph Speed Triple. He was the second-fastest motorcycle racer up the mountain, and won the Exhibition Class with a time of 11:26.530.

== AMA Vance & Hines XR1200 Championship ==
Kopp raced in the AMA Vance & Hines XR1200 Championship in 2011, earning a third-place finish at the series opener in Daytona Beach, Florida. The top four finishers in the race were separated by only two-tenths of one second.

== Career highlights ==
2000- AMA Grand National Champion, Supertracker Champion, Hotshoe Champion Corbin Harley-Davidson XR-750, KTM 505, Suzuki TL1000
2001- 3rd, AMA Grand National Championship Corbin Harley-Davidson XR-750, KTM 505
2003- 3rd, AMA Grand National Championship KTM Harley-Davidson XR-750, KTM 450
2004- 2nd, AMA Grand National Championship KTM Harley-Davidson XR-750, KTM 450
2005- 3rd, AMA Grand National Championship Latus H-D Harley-Davidson XR-750, Honda CRF450
2006- 3rd, AMA Grand National Championship Latus H-D Harley-Davidson XR-750, Honda CRF450
2008- 2nd, AMA Grand National Championship Latus H-D Harley-Davidson XR-750, Honda CRF450
2009- 2nd, AMA Grand National Championship Latus H-D Harley-Davidson XR-750, Honda CRF450
2010- 2nd, AMA Grand National Championship Latus H-D Harley-Davidson XR-750, Lloyd Bros. Ducati 1000, Honda CRF450
2016- Kopp is selected by Indian Motorcycle Company to be the first to race the all-new Indian Scout FTR750

Preceded by Chris Carr	AMA Pro Flat Track Champion; 2000	Succeeded by Chris Carr
