= Lou Kimzey =

American magazine publisher

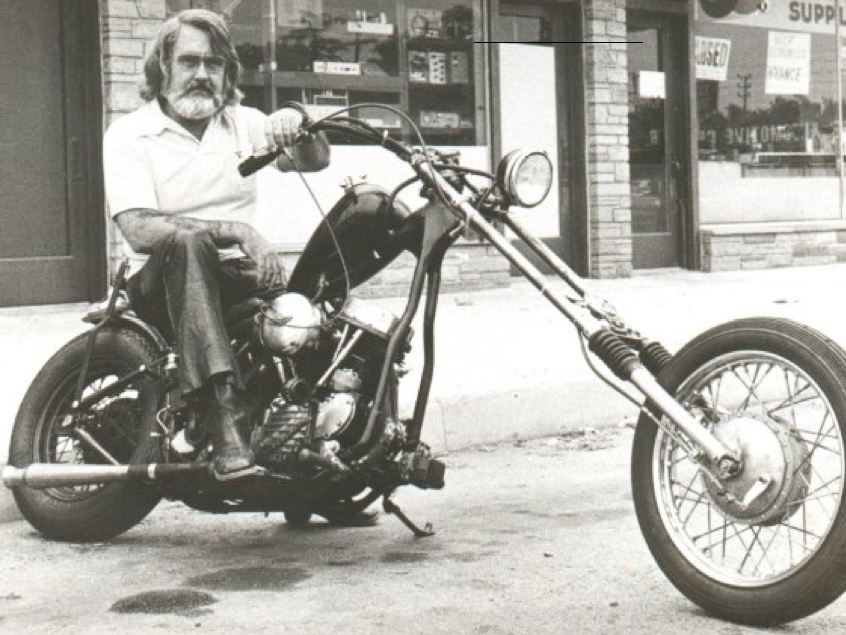
- Lou on his '47
- Born: Louis Lee Kimzey; March 28, 1928; South Gate, California
- Died: November 17, 1997 (aged 69); Los Angeles County
- Education: Woodbury University
- Occupations: Publisher, writer, movie producer
- Years active: 1950 - 1997
- Notable work: Creator and Publisher of Easyriders magazine

Lou Kimzey (Sr.) (1928-1997) was the creator and publisher of the biker magazines Easyriders and Iron Horse.

Lou Kimzey was inducted into the Sturgis Motorcycle Hall of Fame in August 2009.

== History ==
In the early 1970s, after his post as Creative Director of Big Bike magazine, Kimzey was the creator and publisher of the gritty biker magazine Easyriders, the first lifestyle biker magazine on the market. Easyriders became a world sensation, the largest selling newsstand motorcycle magazine in the world with a circulation of over 550,000 copies.

Lou was CEO of Paisano Publications, as well as the Editorial Director of several published monthly magazines and periodicals including: Easyriders, Iron Horse, Biker, In The Wind (quarterly), Tattoo (quarterly), a one-shot magazine called Motorcycle Women, Yesterdaze (book), Earlyriders (book), anniversary issues, annual calendars and various Easyriders paperbacks. Lou also started companies that sold bike modification parts, biker products, and biker lifestyle paraphernalia.

He was a biker himself, and along with Keith Ball, Lou Kimzey created A.B.A.T.E. At that time it was an acronym for "A Brotherhood Against Totalitarian Enactments." It is now known as American Bikers Aimed Toward Education. A.B.A.T.E. advocated fight for biker's rights.

In the 1960s Lou started Magazine Publishing Services and later the Kimtex Corporation. These two publishing houses produced the following magazines: Cavalier, Teenville, TeenSet, Nevada, Las Vegas Playground, Black Belt, Drag Racing, Modern Rod, Drag Strip, Paper Bag, and a one-shot magazine on the 1965 Watts riots, Anarchy Los Angeles.

During the 1950s Teenage Publications, another publishing company of Lou Kimzey's, produced publications such as DIG, which was America's first general interest magazine for teens. In addition to DIG, Lou created and published Modern Teen magazine, Elvis Presley (a one-shot magazine), and various paperbacks. During the late 1950s due to the teen-sensation of DIG magazine, Lou was asked to co-write the cult classic movie called The Hot Rod Gang, and he co-produced Hot Rods to Hell and High School Hellcats.

In Lou's early career he was the Managing Editor of Rod & Custom, Motor Life, and Hop Up magazines, as well as Art Director for Speed & Spray and Road & Track magazines.
