= Dick D'Agostin =

American dancer and musician

- Also known as: "Bird", "Bear", "Thun"
- Born: Richard Earl D'Agostin; November 5, 1936
- Origin: Beloit, Wisconsin
- Died: February 19, 1993 (aged 56) California
- Genres: Rock and Roll, Rockabilly blues, (unrecorded), various types, esp. influenced in his later years by Lightnin' Hopkins, B.B. King, Albert King, Big Joe Turner, James Brown, Etta James.
- Occupations: Singer, pianist, guitarist, dancer, actor, Supervising Deputy Probation Officer with Los Angeles County Probation Department - operating out of Central Juvenile Hall
- Instruments: Vocals, guitar, piano, harmonica

Richard Earl D'Agostin, (November 5, 1936 – February 19, 1993) was an American dancer and rock and roll musician, best known for touring with Eddie Cochran. D'Agostin was a singer, songwriter, pianist, guitarist, and harmonist; and the frontman of Dick D'Agostin & The Swingers.

== Early life ==
Dick D'Agostin was born on November 5, 1936 in Beloit, Wisconsin. His parents were Arthur and Marjorie D'Agostin, and his younger brother Larry D'Agostin was born in 1938.

In 1952, the family moved to Burbank, California, where his father worked as an engineer at Lockheed Aircraft. His father was also a talented and professional horn player. The two brothers, D'Agostin and Larry grew up in a musically active household, being influenced from opera to blues music.

From an early age, D'Agostin played the piano. He was taught at Goodenough's Music Store from a Mrs. Gardner, and from his maternal grandmother. D'Agostin was also a blues harmonica player.

In addition to his passion for music, D'Agostin discovered a passion for dance. He trained as a dancer, becoming an Al Jarvis 1955 teen dance champion. D'Agostin graduated from John Burroughs High School in June 1955. In the same year, D'Agostin and his brother Larry met two teen musicians at the Verdugo Recreation Centre in Burbank, Gene Riggio and Dave Oster, and formed a lifelong friendship.

== Career ==
=== Dance and solo career (1955–1958) ===
D'Agostin and his partner Judi Stein were the 1955 Al Jarvis dance champions and won $1,000 in prize money, topping thousands of competitors, originally performing on Al Jarvis' KABC-TV teenage contest shows Make Believe Ballroom and Hi Jinx.

D'Agostin appeared in minor dancing roles in films, Eighteen and Anxious (1957), and Hot Rod Gang (1958), as well as utilising his music abilities for the role of a pianist in Earth Vs. the Spider (1958). He also was a dance editor and journalist, writing dance columns for two of the first teen magazines, Dig and Modern Teen from 1955–58.

As a solo artist, D'Agostin released two singles on Accent Records, "What Gave You The Idea?" b/w "I'm Your Daddy-O" and "Mean Mean Woman" b/w "Come On" from 1956–57.

=== Dick D'Agostin & The Swingers (1958–1960) ===
Dick D'Agostin and The Swingers were a Los Angeles band signed to Dot Records, composed of drummer Gene Riggio, lead guitarist Dave Oster, saxophonist Paul Kaufman, bassist Wayne Messick, and rhythm guitarist Larry D'Agostin. The Swingers were founded by disc jockey and manager Earl McDaniel.

They released two singles in 1958, "Nancy Lynne" b/w "Afraid to Take a Chance", and "Night Walk" b/w "Give Me You". Their debut song "Nancy Lynne" was a minor hit, with D'Agostin's piano sound being compared to the style of Jerry Lee Lewis. Dick D'Agostin & The Swingers also had a minor appearance in Bert I. Gordon's horror film, Earth Vs. the Spider (1958), performing as a high school band.

In 1958, Eddie Cochran formed a backing band for his Canadian tour and were named The Hollywood Swingers, a reference to D'Agostin's band. Dick D'Agostin & The Swingers eventually became Cochran's touring band. In 1959, The Swingers line-up consisted of muti-instrumentalist and pianist D'Agostin, saxophonist Paul Kaufman, rhythm guitarist Larry D'Agostin, drummer Gene Riggio, and pianist Jim Stivers (briefly on bass) following the departure of bassist Connie 'Guybo' Smith from the band.

On February 7, 1959, Cochran performed live on Town Hall Party with Dick D'Agostin & The Swingers. Cochran played "C'mon, Everybody", "Have I Told You Lately That I Love You", "Don't Blame It On Me", "Summertime Blues", "School Days", Gene Autry's "Be Honest With Me", and "Money Honey". There was a brief interview segment on the show, in which D'Agostin and his drummer Gene Riggio were introduced.

In 1959, The Swingers released their third single "It's You" b/w "I Let You Go", on Liberty Records (Cochran's label). D'Agostin was useful as a multi-instrumentalist, and played piano on the recording of Cochran's song "Boll Weevil". D'Agostin also worked as a session musician for other American artists, such as Freddy Cannon, Jan and Dean, Bobby Vee, Sam Cooke, Johnny Otis, Ritchie Valens, Jack Scott, Lou Rawls, and Big Jay McNeely. He recorded at Gold Star Studios, in Hollywood, California.

In mid-1959, D'Agostin received his call-up papers and was enlisted into the U.S. Army. He was stationed at Fort Ord, California. After the time spent in the military and the sudden, untimely death of Eddie Cochran, D'Agostin departed from the music scene.

The guy I worked with the most, and liked the best, was Eddie [Cochran]...part of the reason I sort of drifted off from the business was when he died...I was on the recording of "Boll Weevil" - I played piano on that...There were numerous times when I played on a session [and] I really didn't know what they were until I heard them on the radio. There were a lot of us [musicians] that hung around Goldstar because there was always something going on. All we would hear is perhaps a rhythm track or something, and we would add our part to it.

— Dick D'Agostin, Gene Vincent & Eddie Cochran, John Collis (2011)

=== Live performances ===
- On June 28, 1958, Dick D'Agostin & The Swingers performed at the Long Beach Drive-in, headlining with Jan and Dean and Diane Maxwell.
- On February 7, 1959, The Swingers with Cochran performed live on the Town Hall Party TV broadcast.
- On March 13, 1959, The Swingers with Cochran performed at the Wewoka Civic Centre on Don Wallace's WKY Teen Hop in Wewoka, Oklahoma.
- On July 12, 1959, The Swingers with Cochran performed at the Memorial Building in Kansas City, Kansas.
- On January 1–3, 1960, Dick D'Agostin & The Swingers performed for the 20th Show of Stars at Hilo Civic Auditorium in Honolulu, Hawaii.

=== Later years ===
Throughout the 1960s, D'Agostin worked as a session musician in the recording studios. He briefly returned to the music scene, becoming a folk duo with his brother, known as Dick and Larry D'Agostin. They performed around Sunset Boulevard, Los Angeles from 1963–1965.

Later in life, D'Agostin worked for 23 years as a social worker and supervising probation officer at the Los Angeles County Probation Department. He worked and operated from the youth detention centre at Central Juvenile Hall.

== Personal life ==
D'Agostin was married to Judith K. Holmes in December 1962, and had two children.

== Death ==
On February 19, 1993, D'Agostin, aged 56, died at the Kaiser Permanente Hospital in Van Nuys, California. He suffered from complications with hepatitis.

== Filmography ==
Year	Film	Role	Note
1957	Eighteen and Anxious	Dance champion	Uncredited
1958	Earth vs. the Spider	Pianist	Uncredited Alternative title: The Spider
1958	Hot Rod Gang	Pianist and Stage dancer	Alternative title: Fury Unleashed

== Discography ==
=== Singles ===
==== Solo ====
- "What Gave You The Idea?" b/w "I'm Your Daddy-O" (Accent Records, November 1956)
- "Mean Mean Woman" b/w "Come On" (Accent Records, 1957)

==== as Dick D'Agostin and The Swingers ====
- "Nancy Lynne" b/w "Afraid to Take a Chance" (Dot Records, June 1958)
- "Night Walk" b/w "Give Me You" (Dot Records, November 1958)
- "It's You" b/w "I Let You Go" (Liberty Records, November 1959)
- "Nancy Lynne" on YouTube
- "Afraid to Take a Chance" on YouTube
- "It's You" on YouTube
