= Indian FTR =

Standard motorcycle

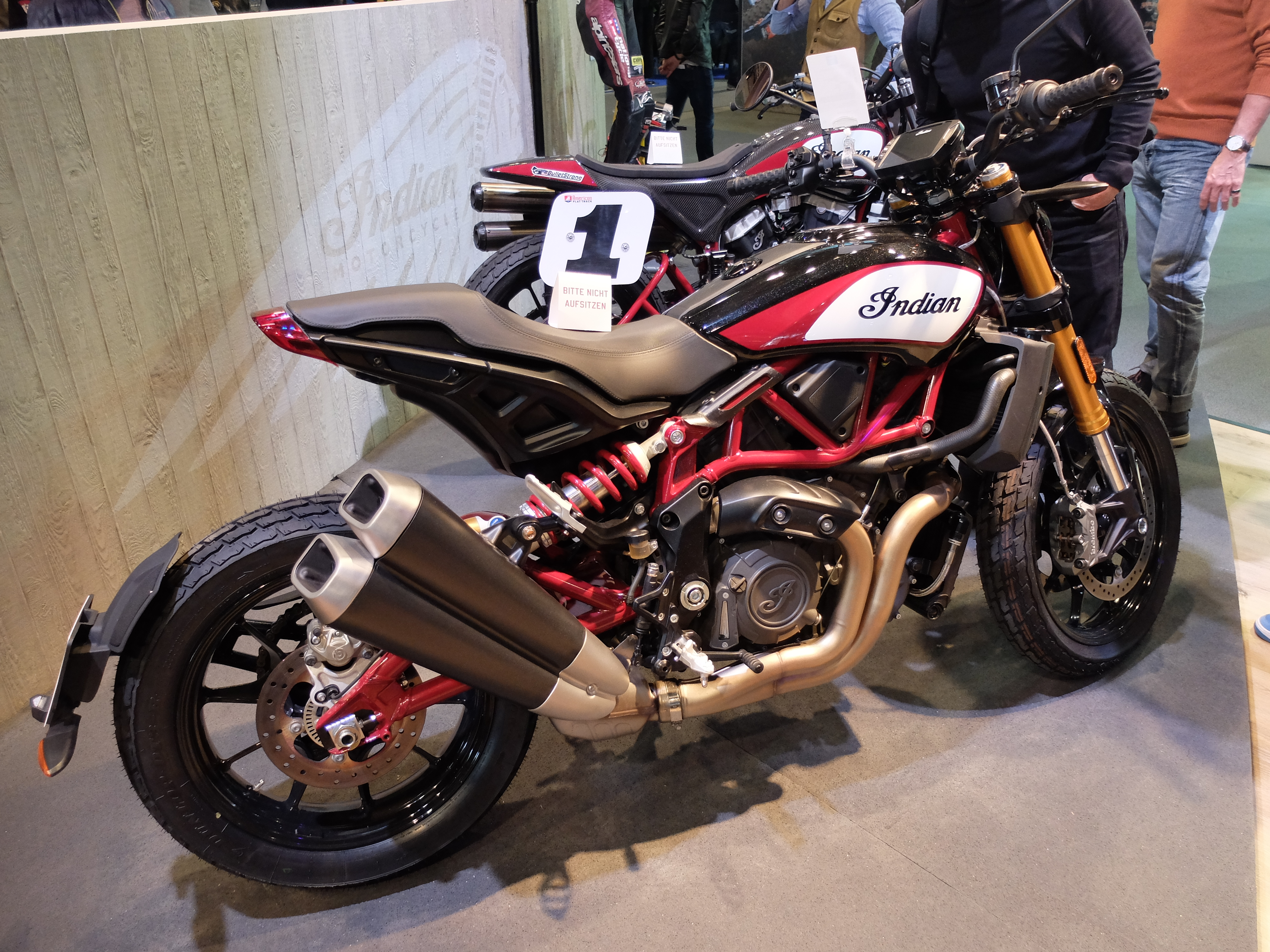
- Manufacturer: Polaris Inc.
- Production: 2019–2025
- Class: Standard
- Engine: 1203 cc liquid-cooled, four-stroke 60-degree, 4-valve, v-twin
- Bore / stroke: 102 mm × 73.6 mm (4.02 in × 2.90 in)
- Compression ratio: 12.5:1
- Power: 111 horsepower (83 kW)
- Torque: 80 pound-feet (110 N⋅m)
- Transmission: Slipper clutch, 6-speed sequential transmission, chain-drive
- Frame type: Steel trellis frame
- Suspension: Front: 43mm telescopic fork Rear: Monoshock
- Brakes: Front: dual 320 mm Brembo
- Tires: 19 inch front, 18 inch rear
- Rake, trail: 26.3-degree rake, 5.1 inches (130 mm) trail
- Wheelbase: 60 inches (1,500 mm)
- Seat height: 33.6 inches (850 mm)
- Weight: 495 pounds (225 kg) (unfueled) (wet)
- Fuel capacity: 3.4 US gallons (13 L; 2.8 imp gal)
- Fuel consumption: 32 miles per US gallon (7.4 L/100 km; 38 mpg_{‑imp})
- Range: 100 miles (160 km)
- Footnotes / references Data from Cycle World

The Indian FTR (formerly FTR 1200) is a standard motorcycle manufactured by Polaris Inc. under the Indian Motorcycle marque since 2019. In early 2025, it was announced the FTR had been discontinued.

The FTR1200 and its derivative, the FTR1200S, have been noted as having design cues from the sport of flat track racing, including the airbox location, dual exhaust pipes, lightweight appearance, in contradistinction to the usual American cruiser motorcycle, and "directly target[s] enthusiast riders who currently have traditionally favored the Ducati Monster, Triumph Speed Triple and BMW R nineT". The "sport" model FTR1200S has electronic stability control and wheelie control, with gyroscopic input to the ABS and other systems to make them lean sensitive.

== FTR750 ==
The Indian Scout FTR750 flat track racing motorcycle is similar in appearance.
