= Chic Stone =

American comic book artist (1923–2000)

- Born: Charles Eber Stone; January 4, 1923 New York City, New York, United States
- Died: July 28, 2000 (aged 77) Autauga County, Alabama
- Areas: Penciller, Inker
- Notable works: Fantastic Four
- Awards: Inkwell Awards 2024 Joe Sinnott Hall of Fame Award

Charles Eber "Chic" Stone (January 4, 1923 – July 28, 2000) was an American comic book artist best known as one of Jack Kirby's Silver Age inkers, including his landmark run of Fantastic Four.

== Biography ==
Fantastic Four #27 (June 1964), Stone's debut inking penciler Jack Kirby on the cover of what was then Marvel's flagship title

=== Early life and career ===
Chic Stone studied at the School of Industrial Art (later renamed the High School of Art and Design), and the Works Projects Administration School. He broke into comics in 1939, at age 16, apprenticing with the comic book packager Eisner & Iger. In the 1940s, he worked on the original Captain Marvel for Fawcett Comics, and Boy Comics for Lev Gleason Publications. For Timely Comics, the 1940s predecessor of Marvel Comics, he contributed to Blonde Phantom Comics, "Eustis Hayseed" in Joker Comics; and "Jeep Jones" in All Select Comics and Kid Komics.

=== Silver-Age Stone ===
Stone largely left comics during the 1950s to become an art director for magazines including True Experience and The American Salesman, and to publish a magazine, Boy Illustrated, which folded after two issues. He did commercial art for Grey Advertising and TV commercial storyboards for Filmack Studios. Stone, at this time living in Hollywood, California, then became art director of Modern Teen and Dig Magazine. At unspecified points, he did art for magazines including Esquire and Mechanics Illustrated, and was publisher and art director of Boy Illustrated.

He returned to comic books during the 1960s Silver Age, initially with the small American Comics Group (ACG) on titles including Adventures into the Unknown, for which he would pencil from 1962-1967. He also variously penciled and inked, uncredited, for DC Comics, and occasionally ghosted for artists Bob Kane (on Batman stories) and George Papp (inking his Superboy pencils).

Shortly thereafter, Stone began inking industry legend Jack Kirby's pencils on Fantastic Four (issues #28-38, Annual #2). He also inked Kirby on early issues of X-Men and the feature "Thor" in Journey into Mystery, and the two artists collaborated on covers across the spectrum of Marvel's comics.

Of his pairing with Kirby, Stone recalled in a 1997 interview,

Just before 1964 I was pounding the pavement, going from one publisher to another, picking up jobs at random. At the time I was penciling Batman, and inking Superman covers for [editor] Mort Weisinger at DC. I happened to walk into the Marvel offices at the time [editor-in-chief] Stan Lee was editing a Kirby pencil job. Looking over his shoulder I was totally awestruck by the magnificent penciling. Stan looked at me and asked, 'Chic, would you like to ink this?' My knees turned to Jell-o; all I could murmur was, 'You're kidding?' ... [After I turned in the assignment,] Stan was exceedingly pleased with my rendition of Jack's work, and from that time on I would finish one job to have another waiting. There were times I'd be working on three stories at once; working 12 to 16 hours a day was not unusual. The page rate for inking was not that great, but being able to work on Jack's pencils was a substantial bonus.

Cartoonist Fred Hembeck, describing Stone as "my favorite Kirby inker", said that "beyond the bold and expressive line Stone's varied brushwork brought to Jack's power-packed pencils, the sheer fact that, by year's end, he was inking the King on Fantastic Four, Avengers, X-Men, and the Thor and Captain America features in their respective home titles gave the entire line a warm and homey sense of visual cohesiveness that it's never quite managed to achieve since."

Later in the decade, Stone returned to freelancing for DC Comics, penciling an occasional Batman story — including the lead tale in the anniversary-issue Batman #200 (March 1968). He additionally pencilled numerous stories for Tower Comics' T.H.U.N.D.E.R. Agents, Dynamo and NoMAN.

Other work around this time includes a run of the character Nemesis in ACG's Forbidden Worlds and Unknown Worlds; Dell Comics' Flying Saucers, and a Garrison's Gorillas TV tie-in comic; and early-1970s work for Skywald Publications' black-and-white horror magazines Psycho and Nightmare. Stone's art for an AMT model car-kit ad ("Grandpa Munster 'Digs' The Drag-U-La!") appeared in DC's Superman's Girl Friend, Lois Lane #64 (April 1966), and elsewhere. After Jack Kirby left DC, Stone replaced him as penciller on the Kobra and Kamandi, The Last Boy on Earth books for DC, pencilling an issue of Kobra and three issues of Kamandi until he "found the press of outside commitments too great."

=== Later career ===
In 1976, Stone began a long association with Archie Comics, including its Red Circle and Archie Adventure Series superhero lines. This work includes a story written by future Marvel editor-in-chief Tom DeFalco in Archie's Super Hero Special #2 (Aug. 1979), and Stone's inking of fellow Silver Age veteran Dick Ayers on a Black Hood story in Blue Ribbon Comics #11 (Aug. 1984). Stone also worked on the regular Archie teen humor line.

Stone was inking for Marvel as late as The A-Team #1 (March 1984). In the early 1990s, he drew commissioned art in Silver Age Kirby-Stone style for sales through dealers.

Comics artist Jimmy Palmiotti recalled,

I first started working on comics when I was in the eleventh grade at the High School of Art and Design in New York City. At that time, I was taking illustration and cartooning as a major, and a friend told me about a guy that needed background help. I called the guy, Chic Stone, and made an appointment to meet him at his Queens home. When I got there, he handed me an Invaders page for Marvel that Frank Robbins had roughed out. He told me he would give me ten bucks to finish drawing a train yard and some other backgrounds on the page and told me to bring it back the next day. That afternoon I went to the Coney Island train yard and sat on the platform above and drew all the trains sitting in the yard. This panel had the Human Torch flying above it. I did what I thought was a great job and proudly brought it back into Chic's smokey Queens apartment the next day. Well, he took one long hard look at it, said it was no good and that it looked like a photo, and gave me five bucks. He told me to go home. You got to remember, this was the most exciting thing to happen to me ever and I got shot down in about ten seconds. I left ... pissed and upset. ... [However, h]e was a nice guy that gave me a shot, more than most would, and he didn't like what I did, so I did not get the job. That's it. I did not know him well, but he was nice about it in my five minutes of dealing with him. He was talented and I was a kid, wanting so hard to break in. That's how it goes sometimes.

Although Stone did not ink any Frank Robbins pages of The Invaders, he did pencil one issue and inked several issued that were pencilled by Alan Kupperberg.

Stone died in 2000 in Autauga County, Alabama.

== Awards ==
- 2024: Stone was inducted into the Inkwell Awards Joe Sinnott Hall of Fame.

== Audio ==
- Audio of Merry Marvel Marching Society record, including voice of Chic Stone
