= Modern Teen =

US teen magazine

- Categories: Teen
- Frequency: Monthly
- Founded: 1957
- Final issue: 1965
- Company: Teenage Publications
- Country: United States
- Based in: Hollywood, California
- Language: English

Modern Teen was a monthly American magazine for working-class teens during the 1950s and 1960s..///.

== History and profile ==
Published from 1957–1965, Modern Teen was one of the first magazines aimed at a teenage audience. It was published by Kimzey Publications, headed by Lou Kimzey, who also edited it. Chic Stone was its artistic director, and Dick D'Agostin edited the dance column. Covers often featured popular musicians and actors such as Elvis Presley and Sandra Dee. It was based in Hollywood, California.

Commenting on Modern Teen, Dig, and other magazines that were popular in the 1950s, a contemporary sociologist writes, "In sharp contrast with the moralistic flavor of earlier youth magazines, the post-war group is distinguished by its portrayal of hedonistic values within an essentially amoral setting: the teen years are not ones of preparation for responsible adulthood, but of play and diversion." The magazines were alternatives to the middle-class messages of Seventeen.
