= Biker culture =

Biker culture may refer to various aspects of motorcycling and relevant subculture, specifically that of:

- Motorcycle clubs, groups of individuals whose primary interest and activities involve motorcycles
- Outlaw motorcycle clubs, also called one percenter clubs or motorcycle gangs

== See also ==
- Bicycle culture
- Category:Motorcycling subculture
