= AutoCAD =

Computer-aided design and drafting software

- Developer: Autodesk
- Release: December 1982; 43 years ago
- Stable release: AutoCAD 2027 / March 25, 2026; 7 months ago
- Operating system: Windows, macOS
- Available in: 14 languages
- List of languages English, German, French, Italian, Spanish, Korean, Chinese Simplified, Chinese Traditional, Japanese, Brazilian Portuguese, Russian, Czech, Polish and Hungarian
- Type: Computer-aided design
- License: Proprietary software as a service
- Website: www.autodesk.com/products/autocad/overview

AutoCAD is a 2D and 3D computer-aided design (CAD) software application developed by Autodesk. It was first released in December 1982 for the CP/M and IBM PC platforms as a desktop app running on microcomputers with internal graphics controllers. Versions were later released for other platforms including Classic Mac OS (1992), Windows (1993), and macOS (2010), iOS (2010), and Android (2011).

AutoCAD is a general drafting and design application used in industry by architects, project managers, engineers, interior designers, graphic designers, city planners, and other professionals to prepare technical drawings. After discontinuing the sale of perpetual licenses in January 2016, commercial versions of AutoCAD are licensed through a term-based subscription or Autodesk Flex, a pay-as-you-go option introduced on September 24, 2021. Subscriptions to the desktop version of AutoCAD include access to the web and mobile applications. However, users can subscribe separately to the AutoCAD Web App online or AutoCAD Mobile through an in-app purchase.

== History ==
Before AutoCAD was introduced, most CAD programs ran on mainframe computers or minicomputers, with each CAD operator (user) working at a separate graphics terminal.

Product activation dependent on Autodesk activation servers became mandatory for retail licenses from release 2005 onwards, and network licenses from release 2006 onwards. Prior to this, AutoCAD releases in some regions required installation of a software protection dongle to function.

=== Origins ===
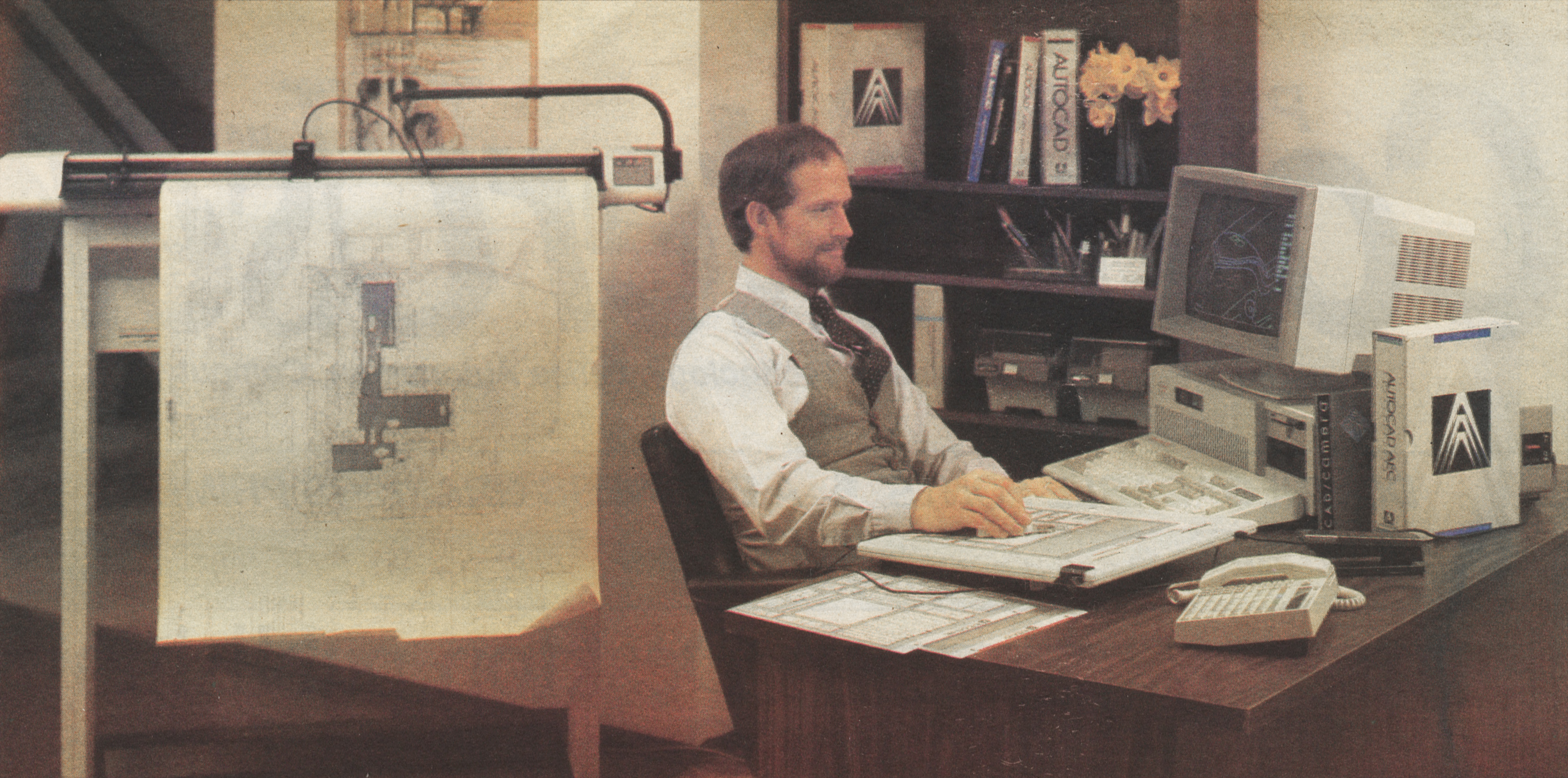
A man using AutoCAD 2.6 to digitize a drawing of a school building

AutoCAD was derived from a program that began in 1977, and then released in 1979 named Interact CAD, also referred to in early Autodesk documents as MicroCAD, which was written prior to Autodesk's (then Marinchip Software Partners) formation by Autodesk cofounder Michael Riddle.

The first version by Autodesk was demonstrated at the 1982 Comdex and released that December. AutoCAD supported CP/M-80 computers. As Autodesk's flagship product, by March 1986 AutoCAD had become the most ubiquitous CAD program worldwide; Jerry Pournelle of BYTE wrote that year that "AutoCAD holds a commanding lock on the top end of professional CAD systems for micro computers". The first UNIX version was Release 10 for Xenix in October 1989, while the first version for Windows was Release 12, released in February 1993.

== Features ==
=== Compatibility with other software ===
Many software applications such as Autodesk Civil 3D and ESRI ArcMap 10 permits export as AutoCAD drawing files. Third-party file converters exist for specific formats such as Bentley MX GENIO Extension, PISTE Extension (France), ISYBAU (Germany), OKSTRA and Microdrainage (UK); also, conversion of .pdf files is feasible, however, the accuracy of the results may be unpredictable or distorted. For example, jagged edges may appear. Several vendors provide online conversions for free such as Cometdocs.

=== Language ===
AutoCAD and AutoCAD LT are available for English, German, French, Italian, Spanish, Japanese, Korean, Chinese Simplified, Chinese Traditional, Brazilian Portuguese, Russian, Czech, Polish and Hungarian (also through additional language packs). The extent of localization varies from full translation of the product to documentation only. The AutoCAD command set is localized as a part of the software localization.

=== Extensions ===
AutoCAD supports a number of APIs for customization and automation. These include AutoLISP, Visual LISP, VBA, .NET, JavaScript, and ObjectARX. ObjectARX is a C++ class library, which was also the base for:

- products extending AutoCAD functionality to specific fields
- creating products such as AutoCAD Architecture, AutoCAD Electrical, AutoCAD Civil 3D
- third-party AutoCAD-based application

There are a large number of AutoCAD plugins (add-on applications) available on the application store Autodesk Exchange Apps. AutoCAD's DXF, drawing exchange format, allows importing and exporting drawing information.

=== Vertical integration ===
Autodesk has also developed a few vertical programs for discipline-specific enhancements such as:

- Advance Steel
- AutoCAD Architecture
- AutoCAD Electrical
- AutoCAD Map 3D
- AutoCAD Mechanical
- AutoCAD MEP
- AutoCAD Plant 3D
- Autodesk Civil 3D

Since AutoCAD 2019 several verticals are included with AutoCAD subscription as Industry-Specific Toolset.

For example, AutoCAD Architecture (formerly Architectural Desktop) permits architectural designers to draw 3D objects, such as walls, doors, and windows, with more intelligent data associated with them rather than simple objects, such as lines and circles. The data can be programmed to represent specific architectural products sold in the construction industry, or extracted into a data file for pricing, materials estimation, and other values related to the objects represented.

Additional tools generate standard 2D drawings, such as elevations and sections, from a 3D architectural model. Similarly, Civil Design, Civil Design 3D, and Civil Design Professional support data-specific objects facilitating easy standard civil engineering calculations and representations.

Softdesk Civil was developed as an AutoCAD add-on by a company in New Hampshire called Softdesk (originally DCA). Softdesk was acquired by Autodesk, and Civil became Land Development Desktop (LDD), later renamed Land Desktop. Civil 3D was later developed and Land Desktop was retired.

== Platforms ==
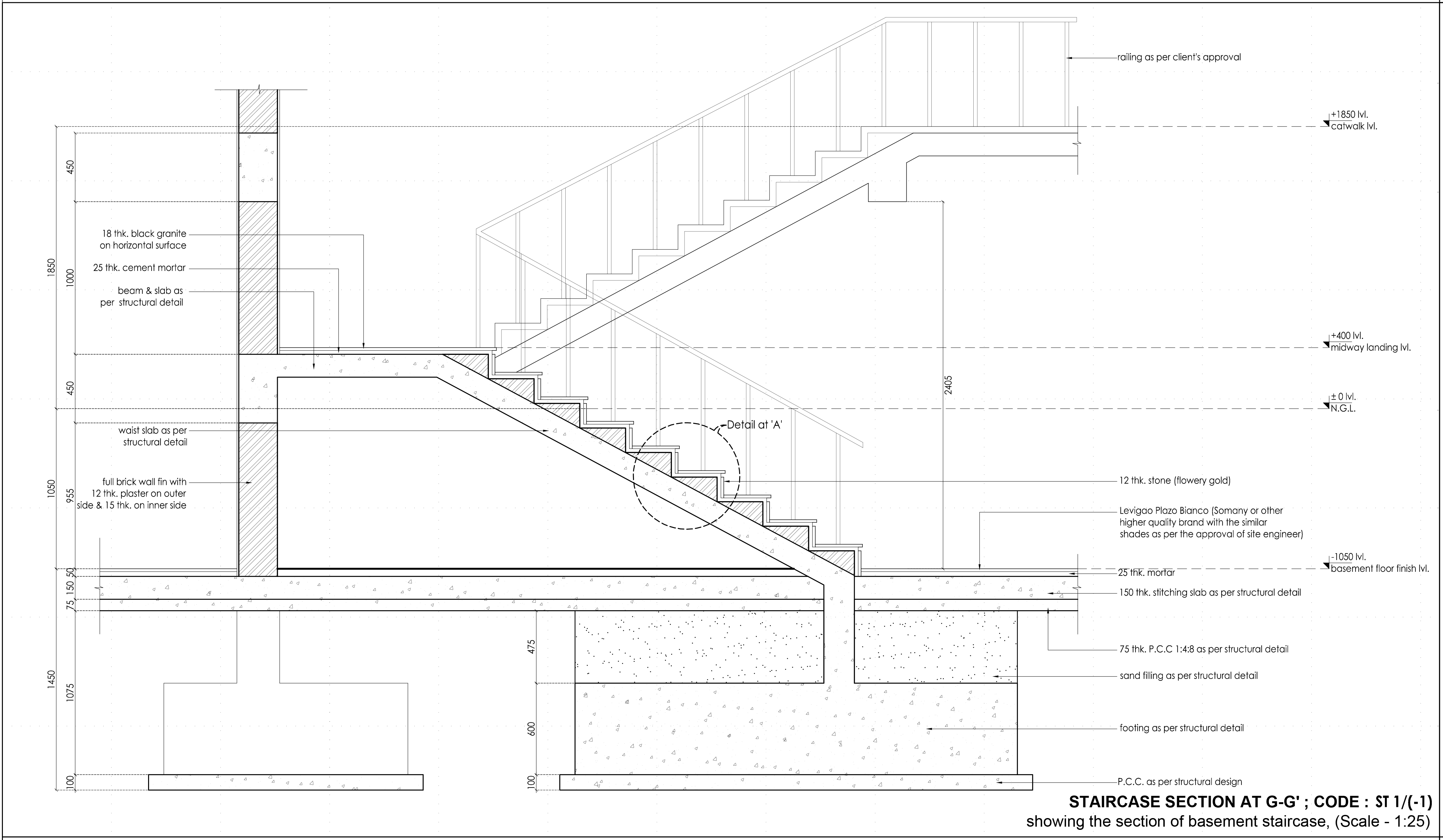
An architectural detail drafted in AutoCAD (Windows)

Operating system		Latest release
Windows	11 2024 Update and later	2027 (x64)
Windows	10 October 2018 Update—10 2022 Update, 11 (original release)—11 2023 Update	2026 (x64)
Windows	10	2022 (x64)
Windows	8.1	2021 (x64)
Windows	8	2016 (IA-32,x64)
Windows	7	2020 (x64)
Windows	7, 8.1 and 10	2019 (IA-32)
Windows	Vista	2012
Windows	XP	2014 (IA-32,x64)
Windows	2000	2008
Windows	NT 4.0	2004 (IA-32)
Windows	98 and Me	2002
Windows	95	2000i
Windows	NT 3.51	Release 14 (IA-32)
Windows	3.1x, NT 3.5–3.51 (IA-32, Alpha)	Release 13
macOS	14 and later	2027
macOS	13	2026
macOS	12	2025
macOS	11	2024
macOS	10.15	2023
macOS	10.14	2022
macOS	10.13	2021
macOS	10.12	2019
macOS	10.11	2018
macOS	10.10	2017
macOS	10.9	2016
macOS	10.8	2015
macOS	10.6–10.7	2013 (x64)
macOS	10.5	2011 (x64)
macOS	7.x	Release 12
macOS	6.x	Release 10
Solaris 2.0, IRIX, AIX, HP-UX and DOS		Release 13
SunOS 4.1 and Ultrix		Release 12
DOS (286)		Release 11
Xenix and OS/2 1.x		Release 10
DOS (sans-x87)		2.6
CP/M-80 and CP/M-86		1.4

== File formats ==
AutoCAD's native file formats are denoted either by a .dwg, .dwt, .dws, or .dxf filename extension. .dwg and, to a lesser extent, .dxf, have become de facto, if proprietary, standards for CAD data interoperability, particularly for 2D drawing exchange.

The primary file format for 2D and 3D drawing files created with AutoCAD is .dwg. While other third-party CAD software applications can create .dwg files, AutoCAD uniquely creates RealDWG files. The drawing version code changes between AutoCAD releases.

Using AutoCAD, any .dwg file may be saved to a derivative format. These derivative formats include:

- Drawing Template Files .dwt: New .dwg are created from a .dwt file. Although the default template file is acad.dwt for AutoCAD and acadlt.dwt for AutoCAD LT, custom .dwt files may be created to include foundational configurations such as drawing units and layers.
- Drawing Standards File .dws: Using the CAD Standards feature of AutoCAD, a Drawing Standards File may be associated to any .dwg or .dwt file to enforce graphical standards.
- Drawing Interchange Format .dxf: The .dxf format is an ASCII representation of a .dwg file, and is used to transfer data between various applications.

== Variants ==
=== AutoCAD LT ===
AutoCAD LT is the lower-cost version of AutoCAD, with reduced capabilities, first released in November 1993. Autodesk developed AutoCAD LT to have an entry-level CAD package to compete in the lower price level. Priced at $495, it became the first AutoCAD product priced below $1000. It was sold directly by Autodesk and in computer stores unlike the full version of AutoCAD, which must be purchased from official Autodesk dealers. AutoCAD LT 2015 introduced Desktop Subscription service from $360 per year; as of 2018, three subscription plans were available, from $50 a month to a 3-year, $1170 license. Since AutoCAD LT 2024, AutoCAD LT support LISP customization.

While there are hundreds of small differences between the full AutoCAD package and AutoCAD LT, there are a few recognized major differences in the software's features:

- 3D capabilities: AutoCAD LT lacks the ability to create, visualize and render 3D models as well as 3D printing.
- Network licensing: AutoCAD LT cannot be used on multiple machines over a network.
- Customization: AutoCAD LT does not support customization with LISP, ARX, .NET and VBA (Feature introduced with release 2024)
- Management and automation capabilities with Sheet Set Manager and Action Recorder.
- CAD standards management tools.
- Parametric modeling: AutoCAD LT does not support full parametric modeling.

=== AutoCAD Mobile and AutoCAD Web ===
AutoCAD Mobile and AutoCAD Web (formerly AutoCAD WS and AutoCAD 360) is an account-based mobile and web application enabling registered users to view, edit, and share AutoCAD files via mobile device and web using a limited AutoCAD feature set — and using cloud-stored drawing files. The program, which is an evolution and combination of previous products, uses a freemium business model with a free plan and two paid levels, including various amounts of storage, tools, and online access to drawings. 360 includes new features such as a "Smart Pen" mode and linking to third-party cloud-based storage such as Dropbox. Having evolved from Flash-based software, AutoCAD Web uses HTML5 browser technology available in newer browsers including Firefox and Google Chrome.

AutoCAD WS began with a version for the iPhone and subsequently expanded to include versions for the iPod Touch, iPad, Android phones, and Android tablets. Autodesk released the iOS version in September 2010, following with the Android version on April 20, 2011. The program is available via download at no cost from the App Store (iOS), Google Play (Android) and Amazon Appstore (Android).

In its initial iOS version, AutoCAD WS supported drawing of lines, circles, and other shapes; creation of text and comment boxes; and management of color, layer, and measurements — in both landscape and portrait modes. Version 1.3, released August 17, 2011, added support for unit typing, layer visibility, area measurement and file management. The Android variant includes the iOS feature set along with such unique features as the ability to insert text or captions by voice command as well as manually. Both Android and iOS versions allow the user to save files on-line — or off-line in the absence of an Internet connection.

In 2011, Autodesk announced plans to migrate the majority of its software to "the cloud", starting with the AutoCAD WS mobile application.

According to a 2013 interview with Ilai Rotbaein, an AutoCAD WS product manager for Autodesk, the name AutoCAD WS had no definitive meaning, and was interpreted variously as Autodesk Web Service, White Sheet or Work Space. In 2013, AutoCAD WS was renamed to AutoCAD 360. Later, it was renamed to AutoCAD Web App.

=== Student versions ===
AutoCAD is licensed, for free, to students, educators, and educational institutions, with a 12-month renewable license available. Licenses acquired before March 25, 2020, were a 36-month license, with its last renovation on March 24, 2020. The student version of AutoCAD is functionally identical to the full commercial version, with one exception: DWG files created or edited by a student version have an internal bit-flag set (the "educational flag"). When such a DWG file is printed by any version of AutoCAD (commercial or student) older than AutoCAD 2014 SP1 or AutoCAD 2019 and newer, the output includes a plot stamp/banner on all four sides. Objects created in the Student Version cannot be used for commercial use. Student Version objects "infect" a commercial version DWG file if they are imported in versions older than AutoCAD 2015 or newer than AutoCAD 2018.

== See also ==
- Autodesk 3ds Max
- Autodesk Maya
- Autodesk Revit
- AutoShade
- AutoSketch
- CAD Overlay
- Comparison of computer-aided design software
- Design Web Format

Open source CAD software:

- QCAD Community Edition
- LibreCAD
- FreeCAD
- BRL-CAD
