= 3d studio =

3d studio can refer to:

- A studio location where 3D work is created
- 3ds Max, an animation software package previously named 3D Studio Max
- Any 3D computer graphics software
