= Francesco Perez =

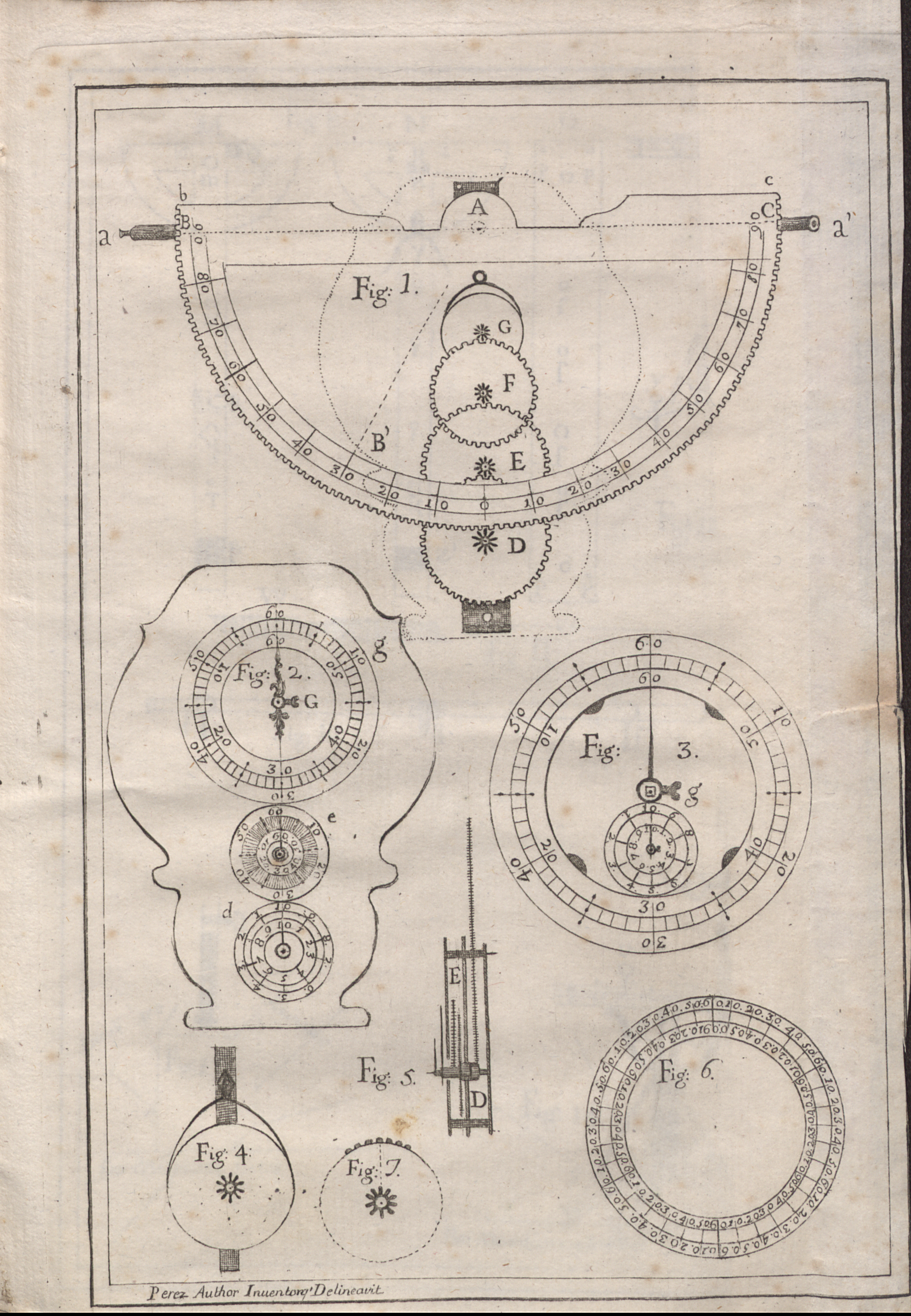
Illustration from the Tri-lichanon goni-arith-metron

Francesco Perez was an 18th-century Italian abbot and mathematician, whose work Tri-lichanon goni-arith-metron, describing a goniometer (instrument for measurement of angles), was published in 1781. He later published a letter complaining about the "plagiarizing usurpation" of this invention by Eliseo della Concezione.

== Works ==
- Tri-lichanon goni-arith-metron id est Tripl-index angulo-numerans et mensurans instrumenti geometrici mostrantis gradus, minuta, & secunda omnia nova inventio quam Franciscus Perez sacerdos Camarapolitanus publico juri Europaeorum mathematicorum dicat (in Latin). Florence: Antonio Benucci & C. 1781.
- Lettera enciclica dell'abate Francesco Perez dimorante in Bologna indirizzata a tutti gl'illustrissimi, e chiarissimi matematici, accademici, e letterati della Italia nella quale si fa palese la usurpazione plagiaria, o sia ladroneccio scientifico del suo strumento goniometrico triplindice fattogli dal reverendo padre Eliseo della Concezione carmelitano scalzo (in Italian). Bologna: Stamperia di San Tommaso d'Aquino. 1786.
