= NURMS =

In computer graphics, non-uniform rational mesh smooth (NURMS) or subdivision surface technique is typically applied to a low-polygonal mesh to create a high-polygonal smoothed mesh.

== Usage ==
NURMS are used in commercial 3D packages such as Autodesk 3ds Max to perform mesh smoothing operations. The mesh smooth modifier in 3ds Max operates by applying this algorithm to a low-polygon mesh and creates a high-polygon smoothed mesh. The new mesh can be dynamically manipulated by the low-polygon mesh to achieve the desired results. There is also an Adobe Illustrator filter that uses the same algorithm of smoothing for 2d curves.
