= CAD Overlay =

Software product

- Developer(s): Image Systems Technology (acquired by Softdesk, now owned by Autodesk)
- Initial release: 1989
- Type: Computer-aided design
- License: Proprietary

CAD Overlay is a commercial software application for raster-to-vector translation in 2D computer-aided design (CAD) and drafting — available between 1988 and 1996 as a third-party application for AutoCAD and other CAD systems.

Developed and marketed by Image Systems Technology, CAD Overlay was first released in January 1988 running on AutoCAD Version 2.6. CAD Overlay replaced the previous generation of automatic raster-to-vector translation systems by embedding scanned documents and images directly in the CAD system.

== History ==
CAD Overlay was derived from a custom AutoCAD application developed using the Nth Engine graphics board in 1987 by David Chassin for Image Integration Technology, a scanning service bureau in Schenectady, New York. In January 1988 Bob Godgart, David Chassin and Michael Mayernik formed Image Systems Technology in Troy, New York.

The first version of CAD Overlay was demonstrated at A/E/C trade show in Chicago in May 1988. Subsequent versions include CAD Overlay ESP, CAD Overlay GSX, and CAD Overlay LFX.

In 1995, Softdesk Inc. acquired Image Systems Technology and in 1996 Autodesk acquired Softdesk,. CAD Overlay was subsequently rebranded as Autodesk CADOverlay.

== See also ==
- Autodesk
- AutoCAD
