= AutoSketch =

2D vector drawing program

AutoSketch 9 running on Windows XP Professional

AutoSketch is a 2D vector drawing program by Autodesk. It is less powerful than Autodesk's AutoCAD and does not support 3D models.

AutoSketch uses SKD and SKF, in later versions, as its native format, but can support DWG and DXF. Version 2.1 for Windows supported macros which has been removed in later versions.

== History ==
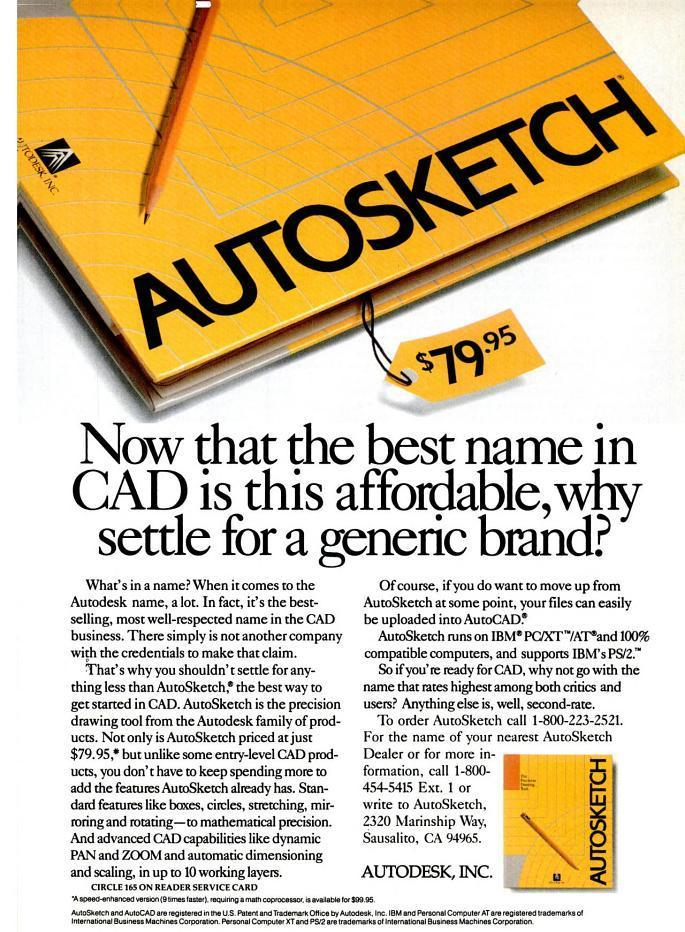
AutoSketch ad from Sep 13, 1988 issue of PC Magazine

AutoSketch was developed by Foresight Resources under the name "Drafix" to run under MS-DOS, and was one of the first Windows based CAD software products. An Atari ST version was also available around 1989. Drafix won the first American Institute of Architect's "CAD Shoot-out". Among the features that made the original Drafix stand out when compared to the much more expensive AutoCAD were the ease of learning, the variety of dimensioning available out of the box, including relative dimensions, and being able to draw new primitives (line, circle, square, etc.) relative to existing primitives or points on them using keyboard shortcuts. One limitation of the first MS-DOS release was that it needed to store all of a drawing in RAM, while editing and could not use any sort of swapping. This limited the size of the drawings. In later versions Drafix took advantage of virtual memory available in Windows to edit more complex drawings. One important limitation was that while Drafix was a complete drawing tool at a reasonable price for many industries, especially architecture and industrial design with relatively small drawings, it lacked the extendability AutoCAD had thanks to its LISP interpreter.

Drafix also took advantage of Windows Object Linking and Embedding (OLE) prior to any Autodesk product. This allowed Drafix to offer features to help automate reporting such as cost estimation and part list generation. Autodesk apparently found this product both a threat and opportunity and bought the company.

After Version 2.1, Autodesk massively changed Autosketch. It was very different in function, menu structure and used a different file format. It is unclear if it was a complete 32 bit rewrite by Autodesk or if they bought in a 32 bit CAD programme and renamed it AutoSketch. Older files had to be converted in order to be opened in the new Autosketch. Much of the speed and ease of older Autosketch was lost, and many users continued to use Autosketch 2.1 while it would still run on 32 bit Windows. The more recent versions of AutoSketch run successfully on 64 bit versions of Windows such as Windows 11.

=== End of support ===
The final version of Autosketch, version 10, was released on November 14, 2008. Since October 26, 2016, Autosketch has been discontinued. Autodesk no longer supports Autosketch and offers no assistance to run the program. The online Knowledge Base still carries a forum, documentation and some technical support.

Earlier Windows versions used the .CAD file extension for drawings which changed to .SKD in version 2, later switching to the .SKF extension. The earlier .CAD and .SKD files could be opened by the later versions.

== In use ==
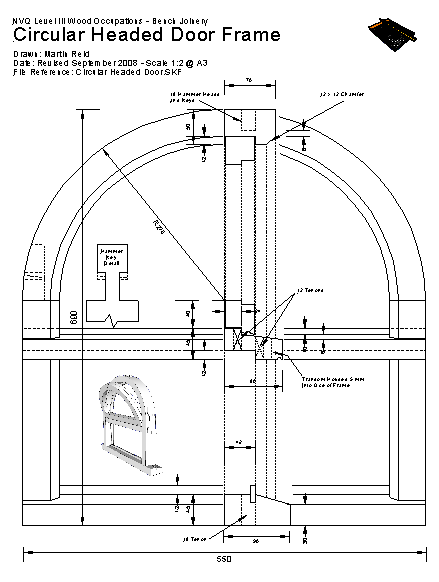
Sample AutoSketch drawing

All technical 2D drawings created can be printed to scale from A4 up to A0 size, saved in native AutoCAD file format or exchanged with other CAD programmes using the DXF file format. Accurate 2D drawings can be opened in Trimble SketchUp and easily 'push - pulled' into 3D models.

The illustrated AutoSketch produced drawing, used by UK Advanced Joinery Students in the practical workshop while demonstrating their skills in the manufacture and production of complex frames.

Using AutoSketch allows students to use and practice 2D CAD techniques on relatively inexpensive software and produce files in the native AutoCAD DWG and DXF file formats that can be used in their workplace and to demonstrating their skills to their employers.

== QuickCAD ==
QuickCAD was similar to Autosketch but with a slightly reduced set of features. In particular some 3D effects were not available. QuickCAD also retained the .CAD file format. QuickCAD was marginally cheaper than AutoSketch.
