= AutoShade =

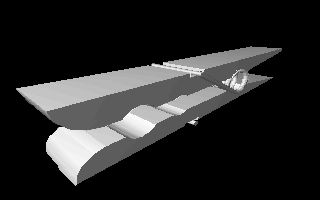
AutoShade 3D Rendering.

AutoShade was an early 3D rendering package for use with AutoCAD. Autodesk developed Autoshade in 1987. It became obsolete after the release of Autodesk's 3D Studio.

== Description ==
AutoShade was an MS-DOS application developed by Autodesk to produce realistic shaded renderings of 3D face objects made by AutoCAD. It simulated various types of lights—spot, point, and infinite directional. To create a rendering, a person:

1. Made an AutoCAD Drawing file containing 3D faces
2. Placed AutoShade light and camera blocks
3. Used an AutoShade-provided AutoLISP application to export 3D faces, camera blocks, and lighting blocks to a scene file
4. Opened the scene file in AutoShade and rendered the image

== Files ==
AutoShade wrote the rendering to an .RND file. In the first version, the .RND file was a 2D vector file, importable into applications such as Adobe Illustrator version 4. Later, when Autodesk added Gouraud shading, the .RND could also be a raster file.

Autodesk developed an application called Flimaker for MS-DOS, which converted .RND files into a format usable in Autodesk Animator. This could be used, in conjunction with AutoFlix, to create rudimentary 3D animations from AutoCAD source material.

== Demise ==
Though the final version of AutoShade supported RenderMan extensions, Autodesk never developed it into a full rendering application. Even with AutoFlix, it did not support keyframing or hierarchical kinematics. When Autodesk released 3D Studio, the need for AutoShade ended, since 3D Studio was far superior in technology and in ease of use.
