= Goniometer =

Angle measuring instrument

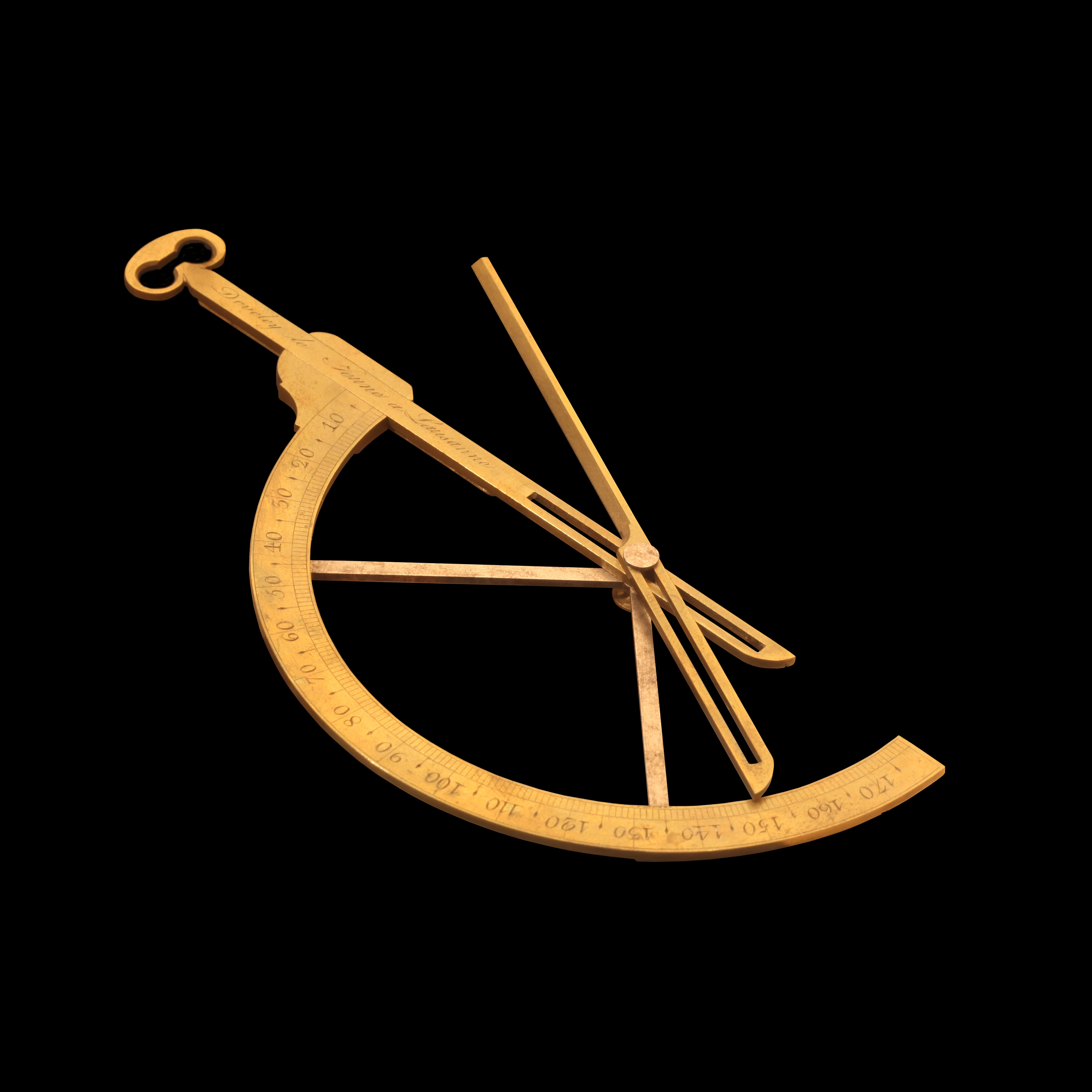
Goniometer made by Develey le Jeune in Lausanne, late 18th–early 19th century

A goniometer is an instrument that either measures an angle or allows an object to be rotated to a precise angular position. The term goniometry derives from two Greek words, γωνία (gōnía) 'angle' and μέτρον (métron) 'measure'. The protractor is a commonly used type in the fields of mechanics, engineering, and geometry.

The first known description of a goniometer, based on the astrolabe, was by Gemma Frisius in 1538.

== Protractor ==
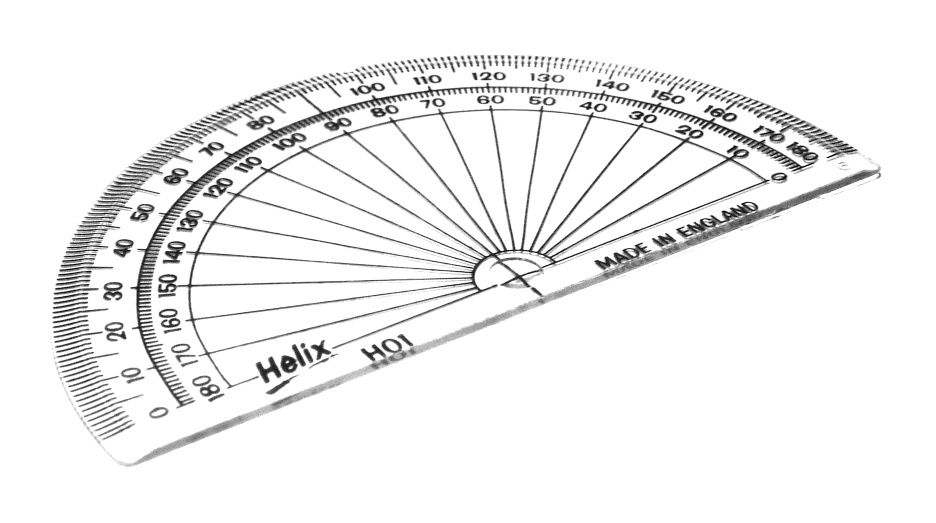
A half-circle protractor marked in degrees (180°).

A protractor is a measuring instrument, typically made of transparent plastic, for measuring angles. Some protractors are simple half-discs or full circles. More advanced protractors, such as the bevel protractor, have one or two swinging arms, which can be used to help measure the angle.

Most protractors measure angles in degrees (°). Radian-scale protractors measure angles in radians. Some precision protractors further divide degrees into arcminutes. A protractor divided in centiturns is normally called a "percentage protractor".

=== Bevel ===
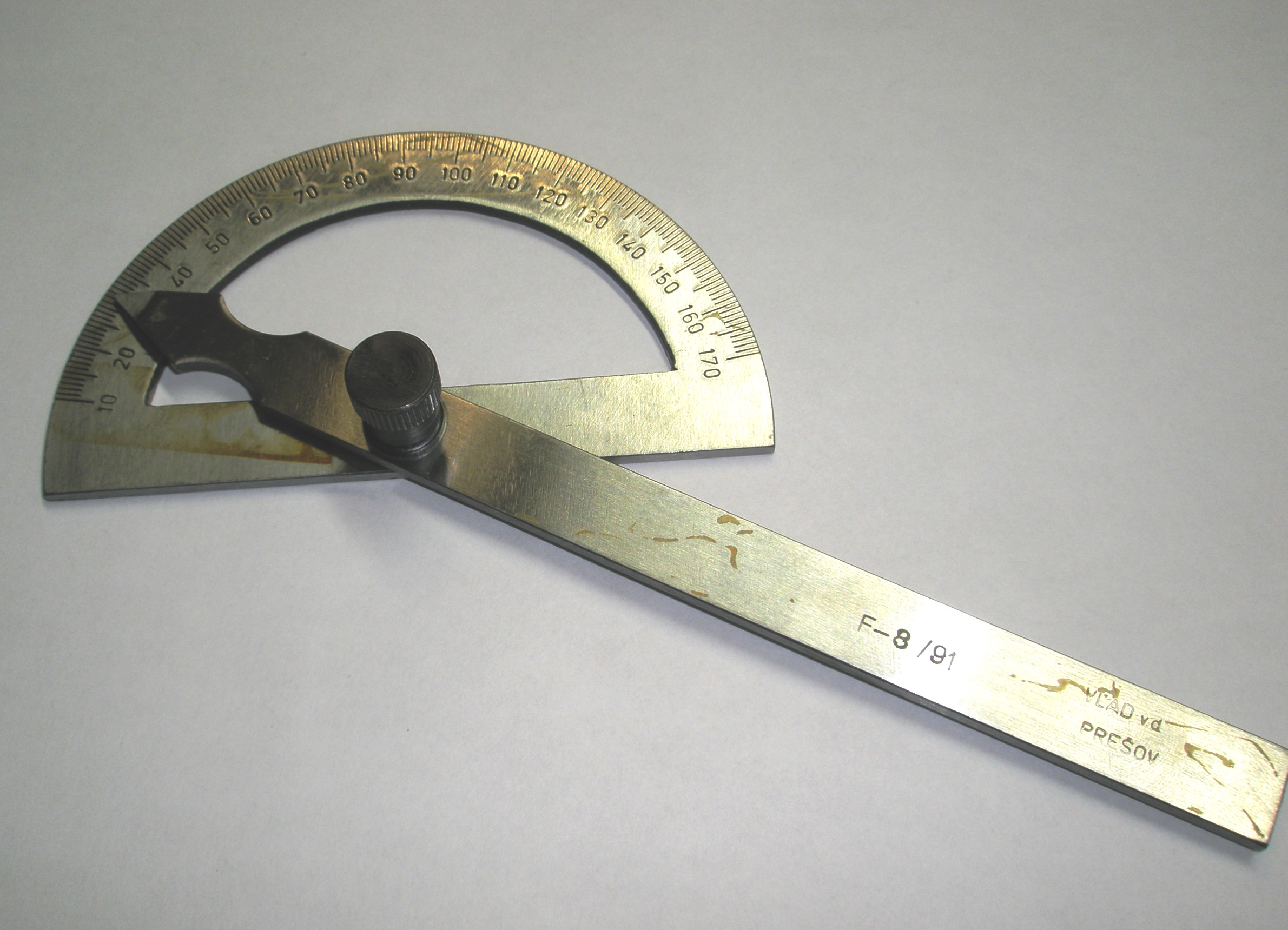
A half-circle bevel protractor

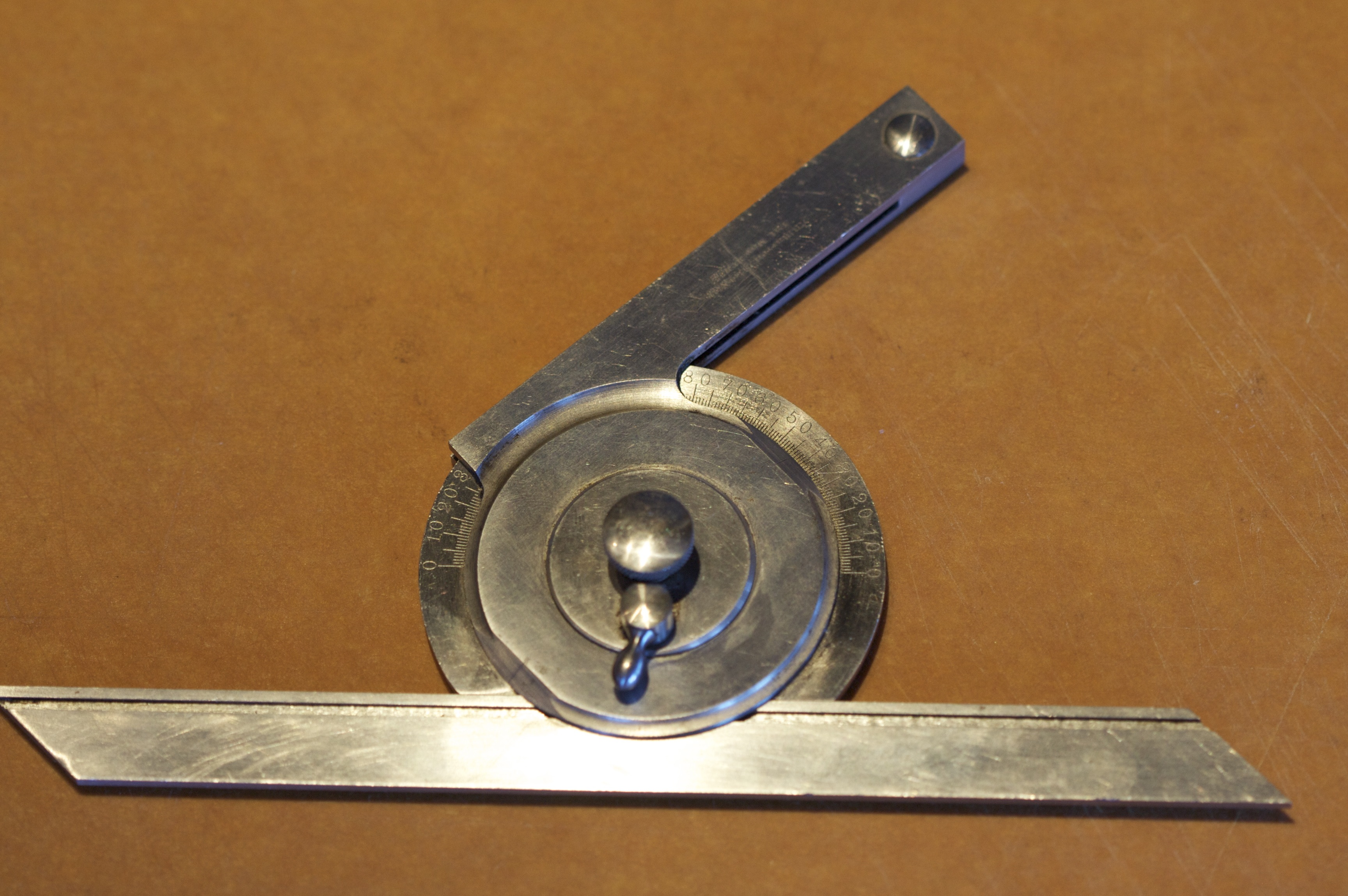
A universal bevel protractor.

A bevel protractor is a graduated circular protractor with one pivoted arm used for measuring or marking off angles. Sometimes Vernier scales are attached to give more precise readings. It has wide application in architectural and mechanical drawing, although its use is decreasing with the availability of modern drawing software or CAD.

Universal bevel protractors are also used by toolmakers; as they measure angles by mechanical contact they are classed as mechanical protractors.

The bevel protractor is used to establish and test angles to very close tolerances. It reads to 5 arcminutes (5′ or 1/12°) and can measure angles from 0° to 450°.

The bevel protractor consists of a beam, a graduated dial, and a blade which is connected to a swivel plate (with Vernier scale) by a thumb nut and clamp. When the edges of the beam and blade are parallel, a small mark on the swivel plate coincides with the zero line on the graduated dial. To measure an angle between the beam and the blade of 90° or less, the reading may be obtained directly from the graduation number on the dial indicated by the mark on the swivel plate. To measure an angle of over 90°, subtract the number of degrees as indicated on the dial from 180°, as the dial is graduated from opposite zero marks to 90° each way.

Since the spaces, both on the main scale and the Vernier scale, are numbered both to the right and the left from zero, any angle can be measured. The readings can be taken either to the right or to the left, according to the direction in which the zero on the main scale is moved.

=== Gallery ===
A 360° protractor marked in degrees.

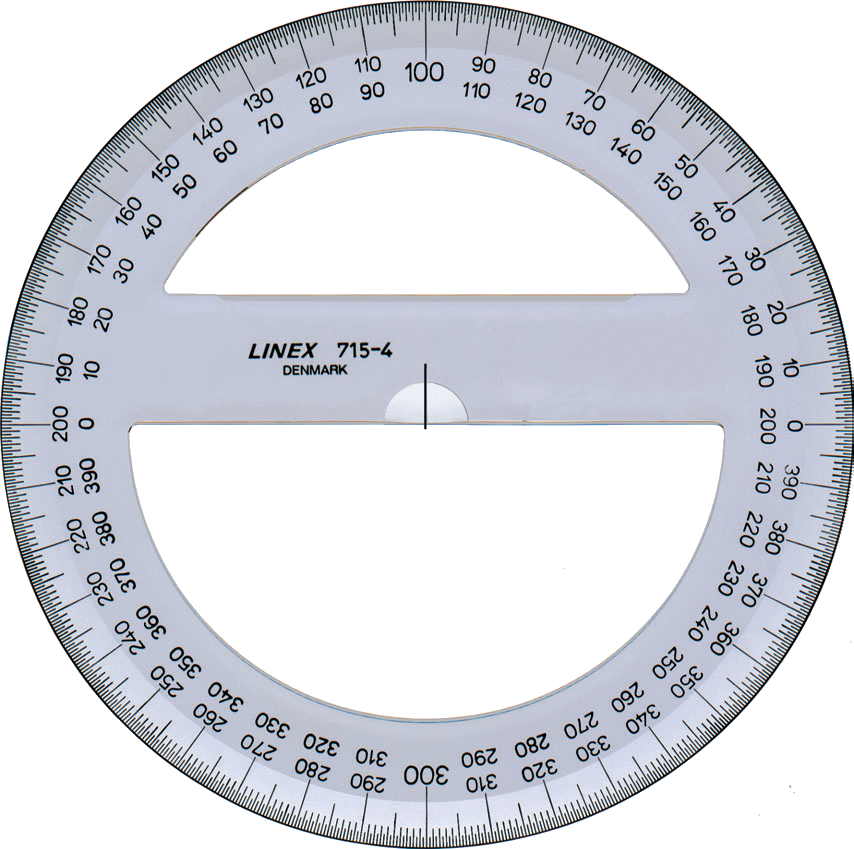
A 400 gon protractor marked in gradians.

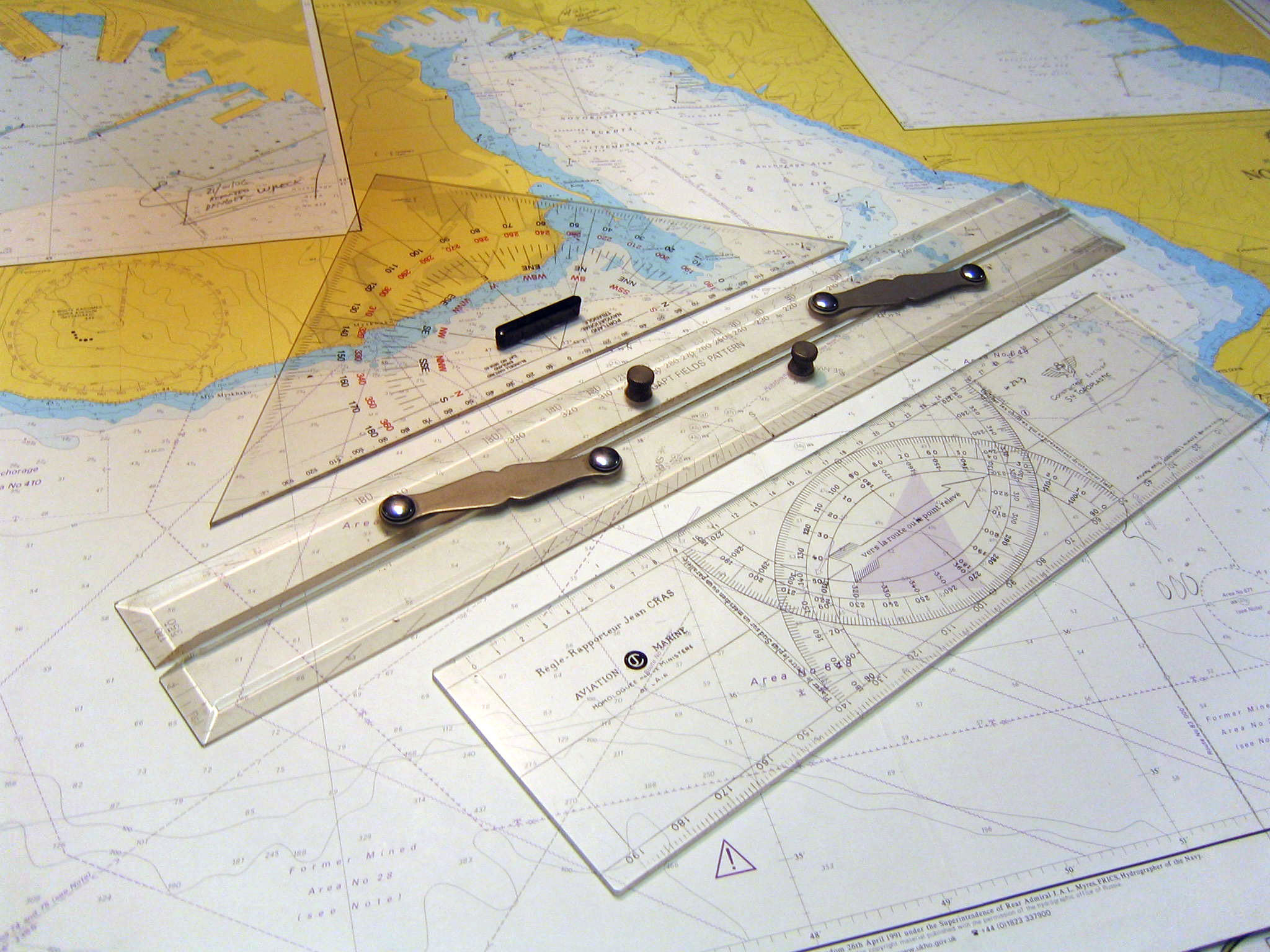
A "Cras navigation plotter" double-protractor, in foreground, named after its inventor Jean Cras.

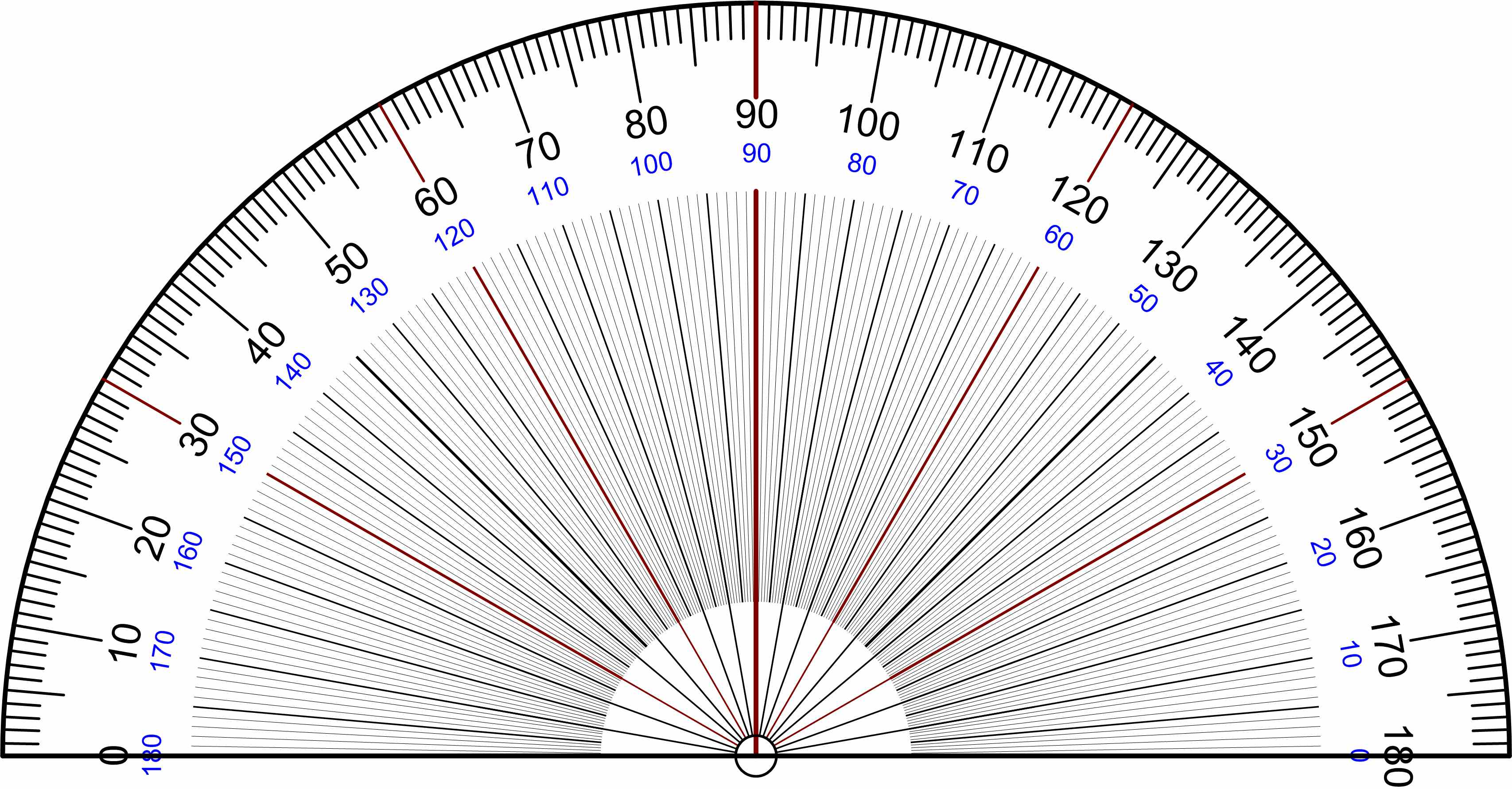
A half circle protractor marked in degrees (180°).

Geodreieck, a special type of protractor triangle (180°).

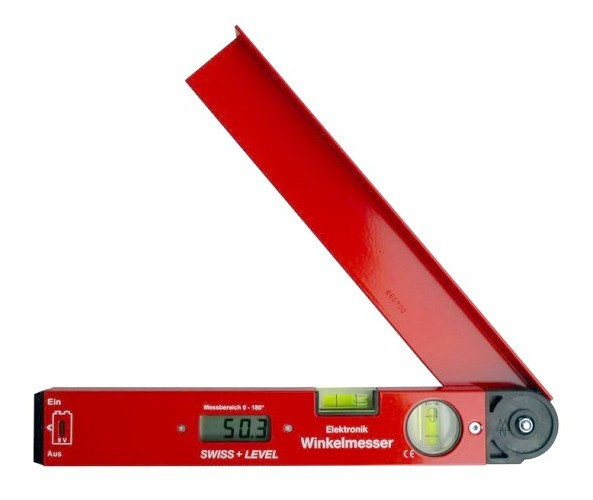
Electronic protractor

Protractor scale in degrees and radians

== Applications ==
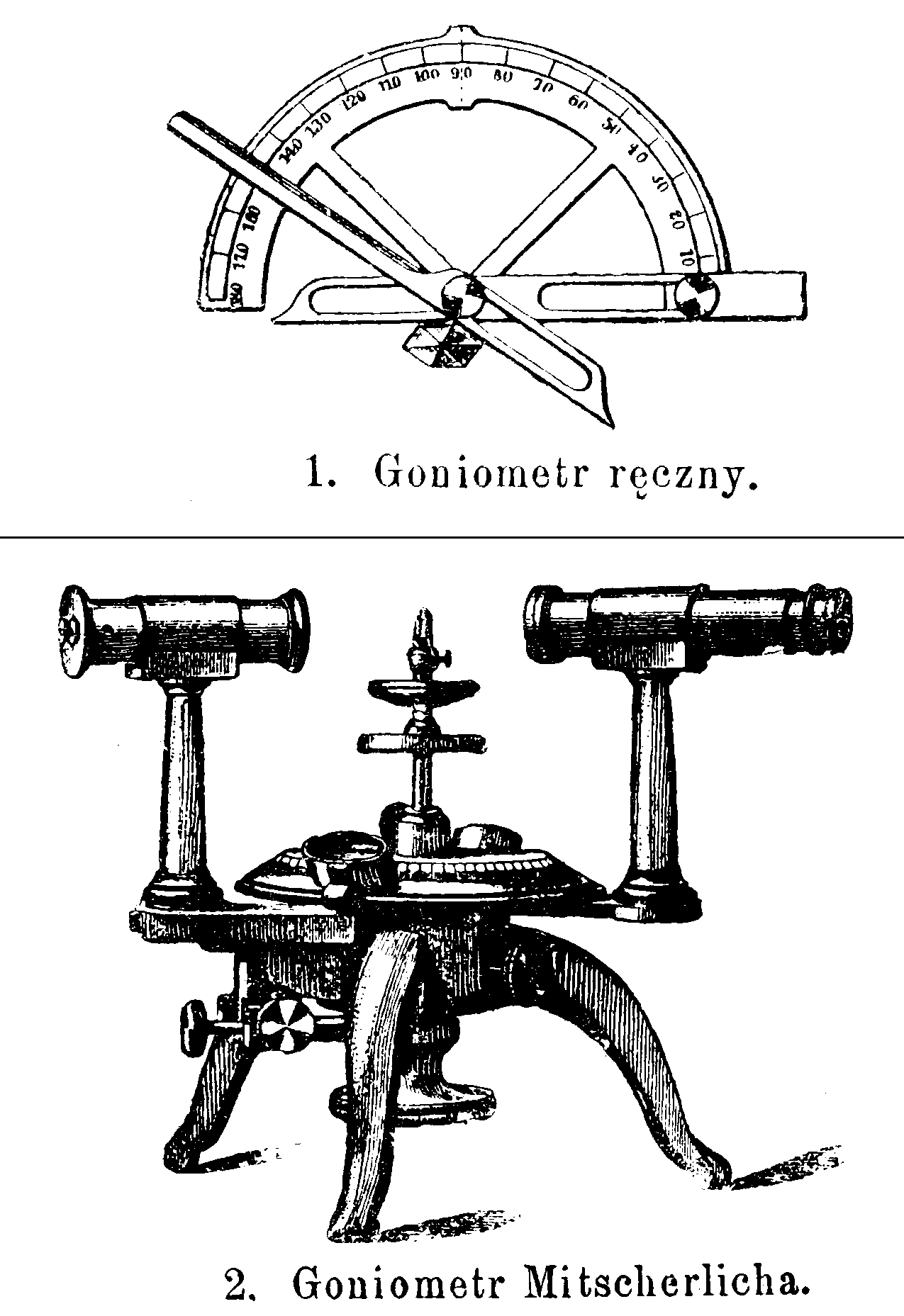
Manual (1), and Mitscherlich's optical (2) goniometers for use in crystallography, c. 1900

=== Surveying ===
Prior to the invention of the theodolite, the goniometer was used in surveying. The application of triangulation to geodesy was described in the second (1533) edition of Cosmograficus liber by Petri Appiani as a 16-page appendix by Frisius entitled Libellus de locorum describendorum ratione.

A simple semicircle protractor or protractor triangle with a knitted small weight attached via a piece of thread to protractor origin point (most of protractors has a thin hole at origin point) could be used as a cheap goniometer, level (optical instrument), inclinometer, or quadrant for a wide range of tasks.

=== In military topography ===
There are various tools designed for use together with topographic maps, often a combination of protractor, scale ruler, and grid scale for measuring azimuth, distance, and coordinates (in MGRS, UTM, USNG, etc.).

Most military protractors and plotters are designed to be laid on top of detailed topographic maps and therefore are made from thin flexible transluent plastic to intentionally avoid parallax and optics distortion. However, this makes tools less durable.

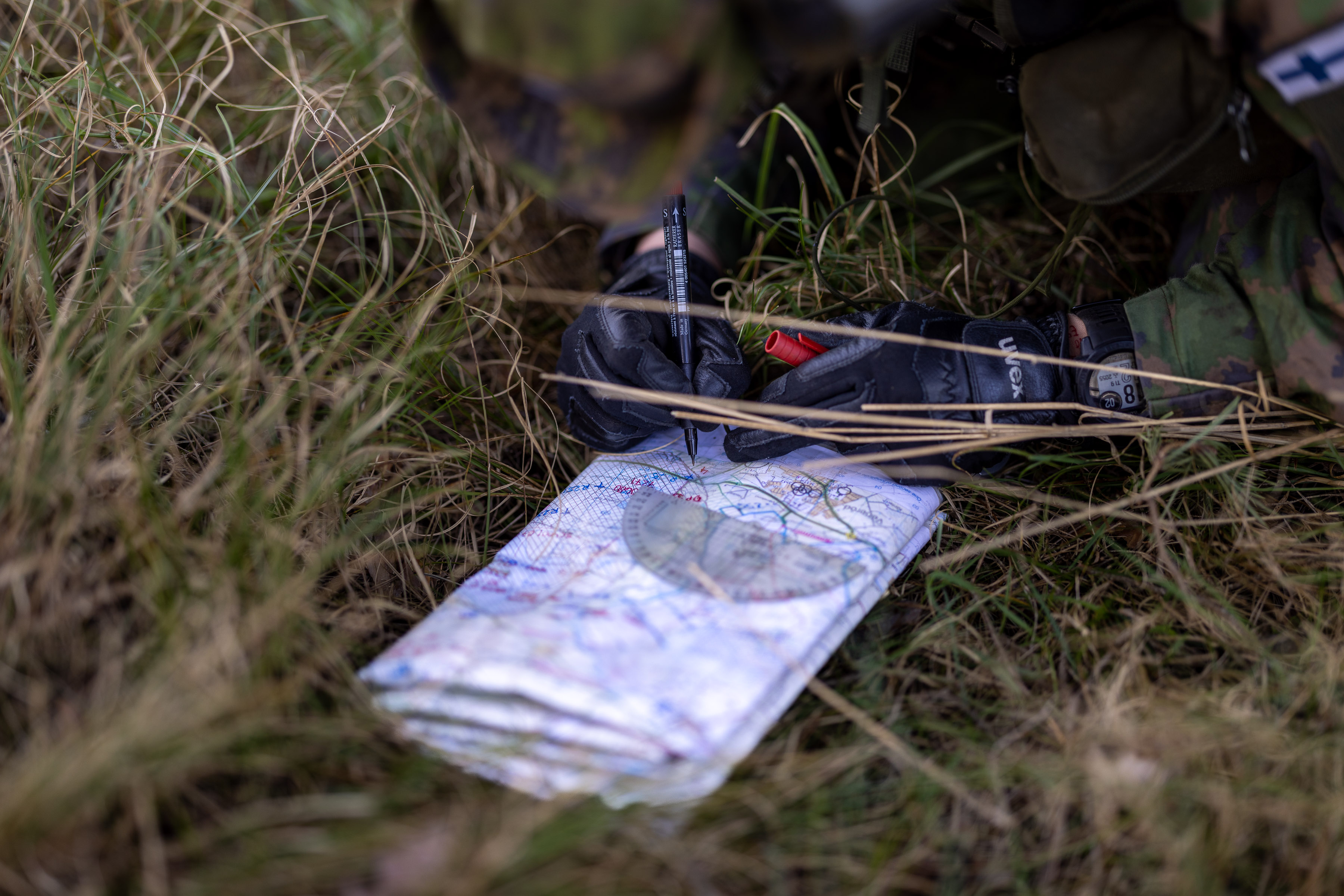
Semicircle military protractor on map

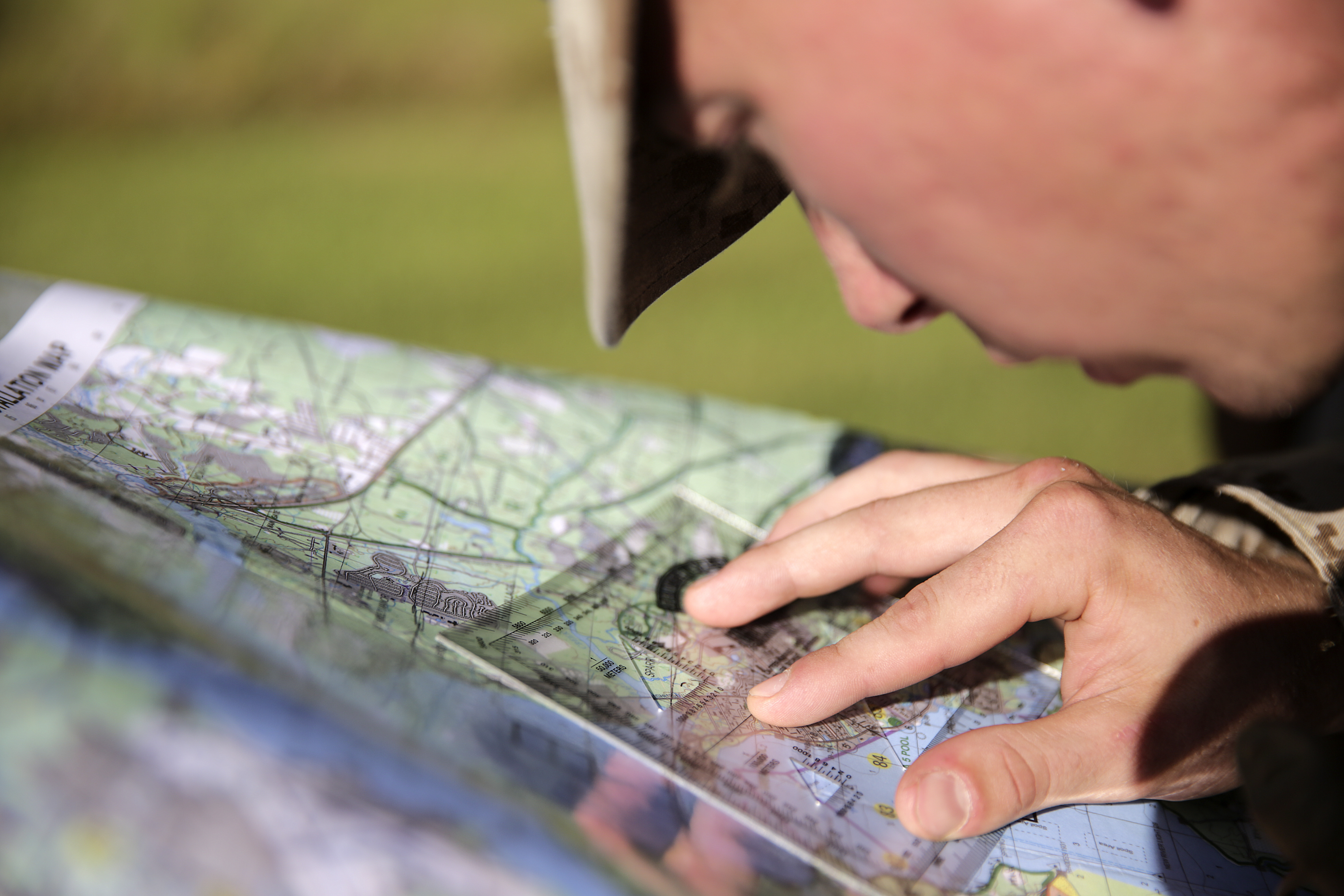
Square military protractor flexed on map

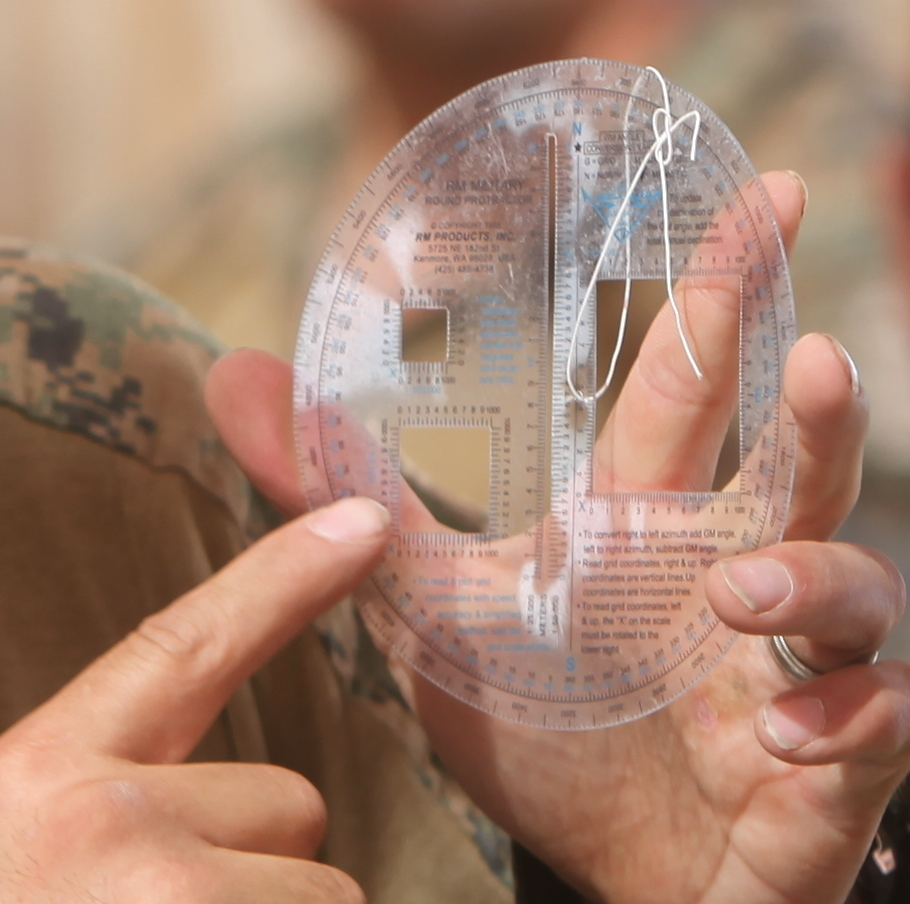
Round protractor flexed in hands

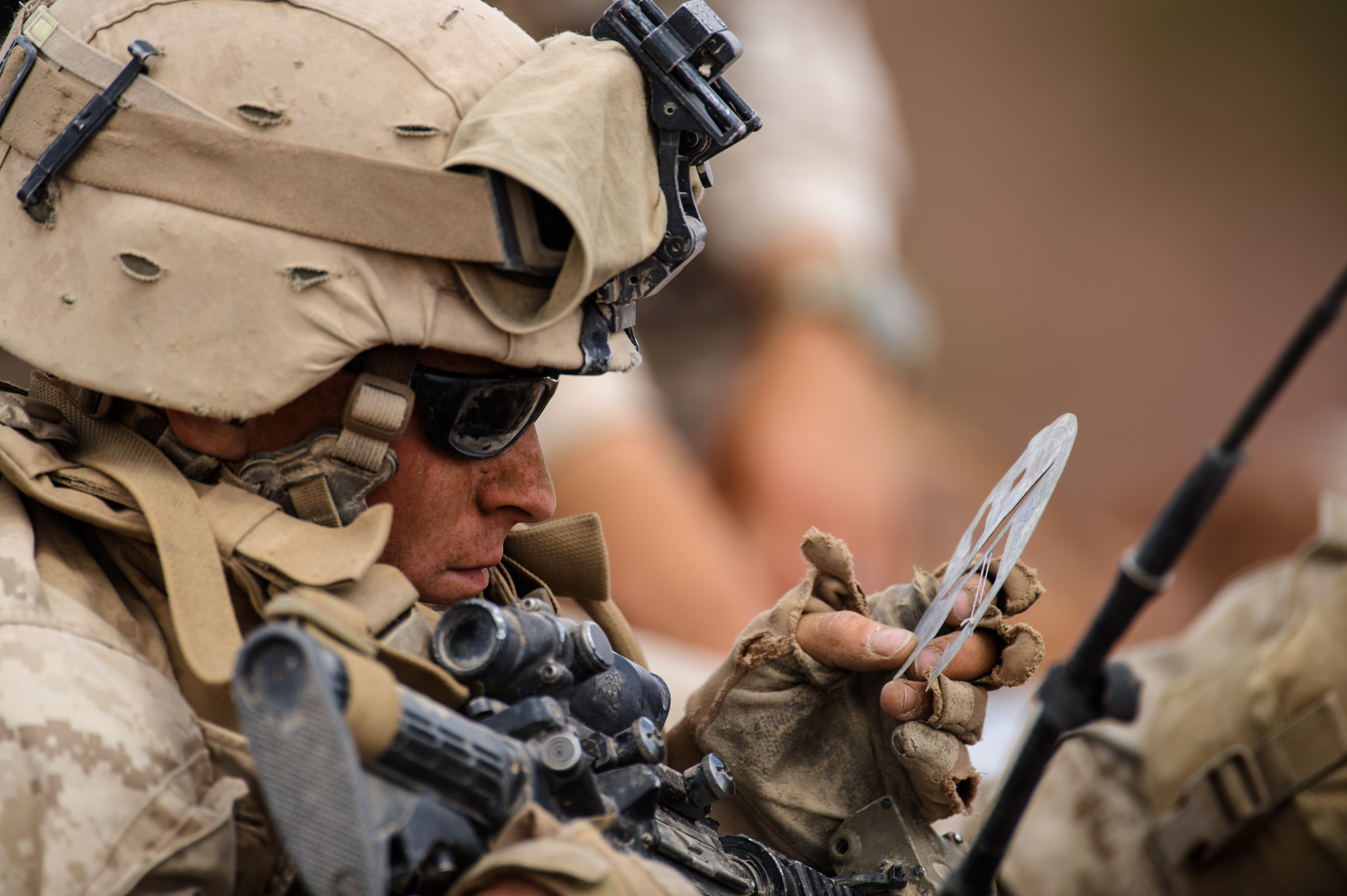
Partially broken military protractor still in use

==== Royal Artillery Mils Protractor ====
Semi circular 6in and 9in Mils protractors, produced in UK (marked R.A.), Australia (marked R.A.A.) and New Zealand (marked R.N.Z.A.) since 1960s for the Royal Artillery, the Royal Australian Artillery and the RNZA. Protractors were commonly used in the Vietnam War and other conflicts since then. Protractors stamped with the Ordnance Survey product number were sometimes additionally stamped with a NATO Stock Number. Instruction on its basic use were described in the Military Map Reading booklet (an excerpt from the Manual of Map Reading and Land Navigation, Army Code 71874. Issue 1.0: Apr 2009). Identical and modified protractors were commercially produced by various publishers.

Its original design was derived from the 400 degrees semicircle protractor (Patent 11465 of 1916) produced by J.H. Steward Ltd. in 1935, since adapted by the Royal Artillery to use Milliradians.

==== GTA 05-02-012 Coordinate Scale and Protractor ====
Since 1981, the GTA 05-02-012 Coordinate Scale and Protractor tool (initially GTA 5-2-12, which superseded GTA 5-2-10) is a standardized 125x125mm square-size military protractor (its official standard is a PDF file with a vector template for print, latest revision released in June, 2008). This tool was designed and produced by the Department of Army Graphic Training Aid for the needs of the U.S. Army. For its users, special guides and instructions were published: GTA 05-02-013 How To Find Your Way (old title: How To Avoid Getting Lost), TC 3-25.26 (FM 3-25.26) Map Reading and Land Navigation, STP 21-1-SMCT Soldier's Manual of Common Tasks, Warrior Skills Level 1, etc.

The GTA 05-02-012, JUN 2008 tool layout

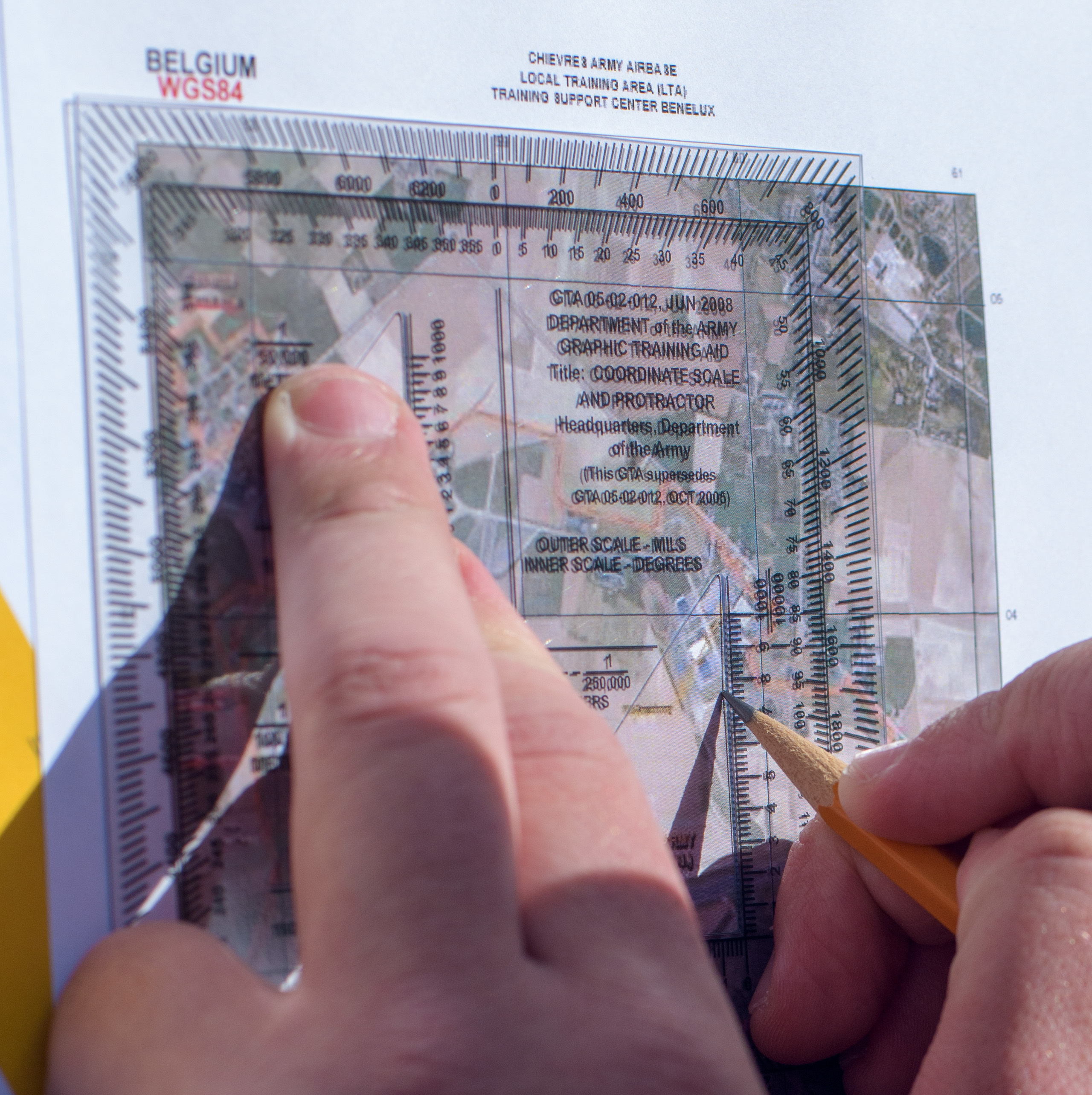
Finding object's MGRS coordinates on map

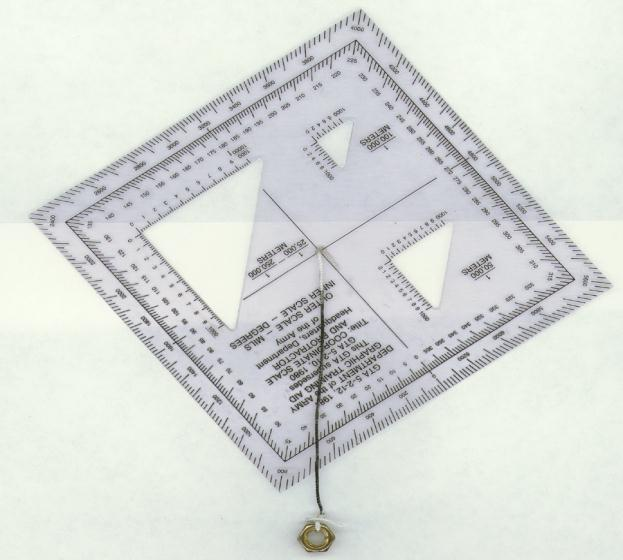
Knitted nut for use as inclinometer/quadrant

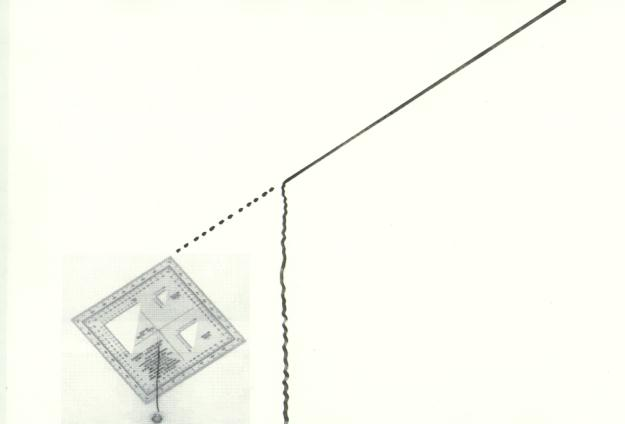
Measuring slope or object altitude angle

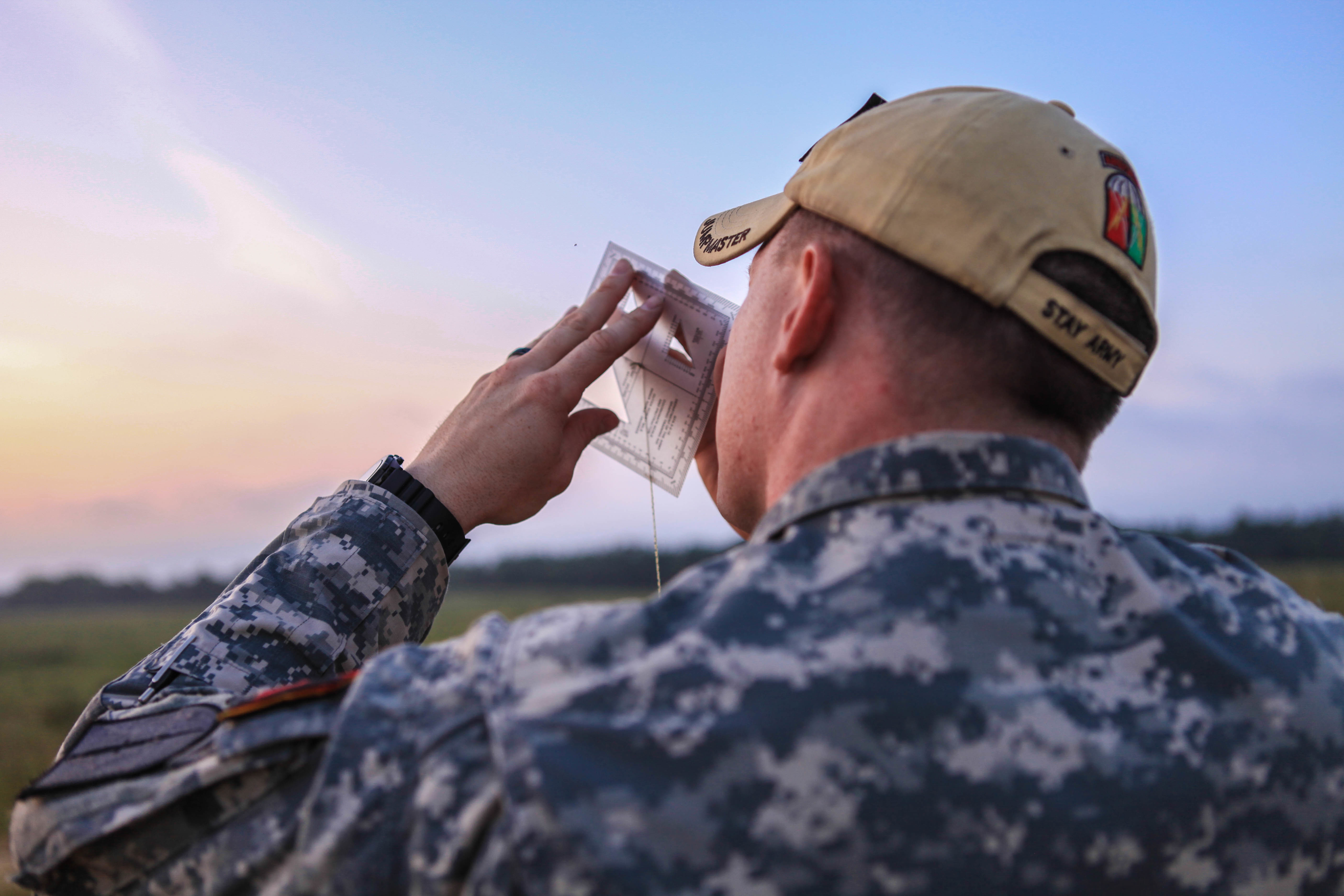
Measuring angle to airborne target

The GTA 05-02-012 protractor is included in the backpack check lists of most military and ranger students, recruits, and first responders. It is also used by military personnel in NATO member states and its allies. Identical or modified versions of this tool, based on an officially released template, are commercially produced by various publishers.

==== Combat Mission Plotter ====
For the needs of combat missions, planners designed special plotters for drafting special symbols on maps. Such tools combined protractors, rulers, and scale plotters on a single plate.

U.S. Army/NATO Combat Mission Plotter PLU-6C

Soviet/Russian combat mission plotter — Officer's ruler (rus. Офицерская линейка)

==== GPS Plotting Protractor ====
The GPS Plotting Protractor is a special protractor used to define positions with an accuracy to 10 meters according to a reference grid. It can also be used to measure GPS accuracy.

In 2017, in Infantry, the magazine of the U.S. Army, training notes were published under the title of Winning in a GPS-Degrade Environment, describing military actions in severe navigational conditions. The author summarized this article with the note:

It turned out that the best defense against 21st century modern warfare was to rely upon the fundamentals from the 20th century: maps with graphics, compass, and protractor.

— Maj. Larry Kay, Winning in a GPS-Degrade Environment, Training Notes, Infantry, April-June 2017

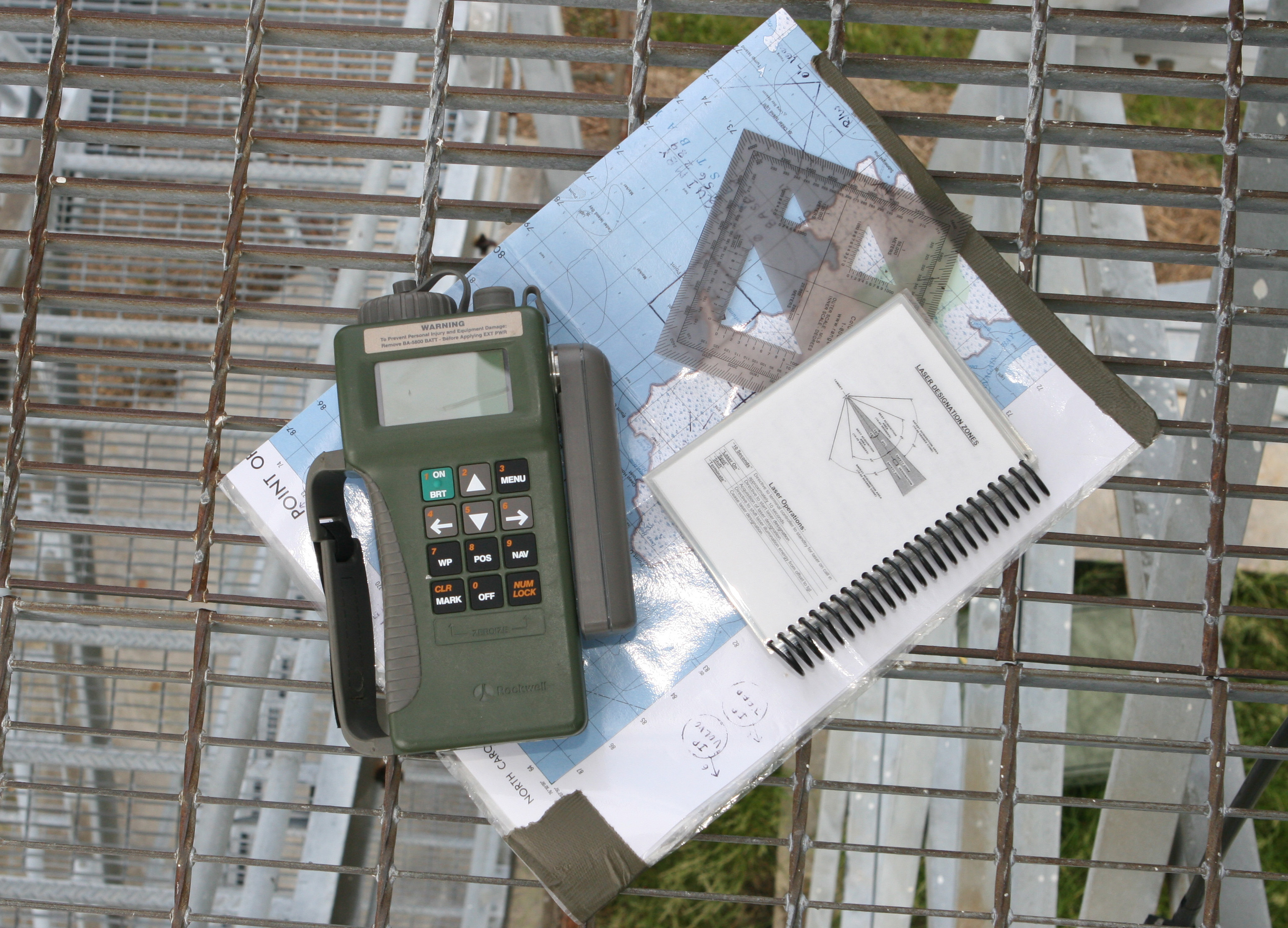
Use of Defence Advanced GPS Receiver sided with

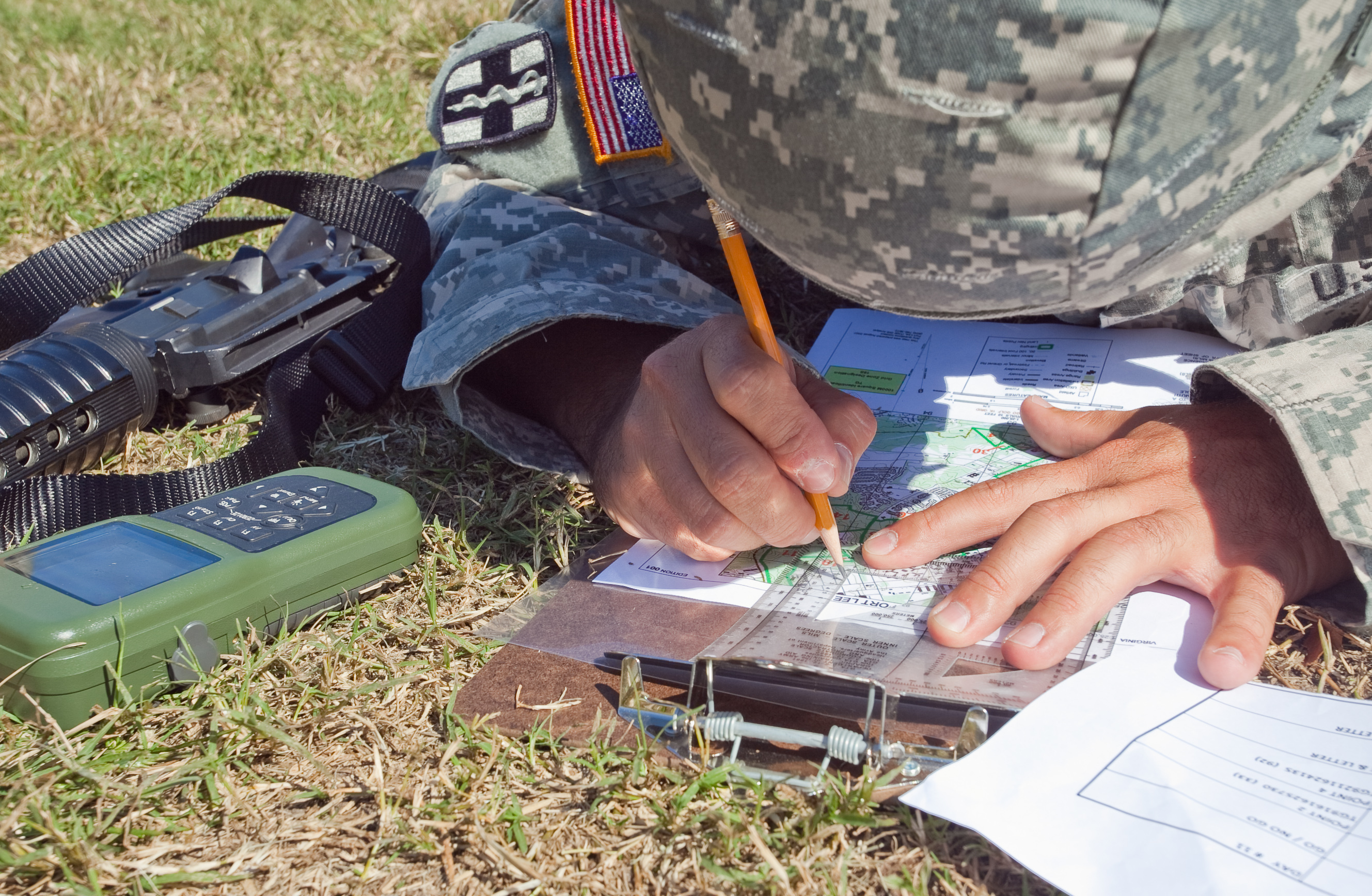
Use of GTA 05-02-012 Protractor

=== Communications ===
The Bellini–Tosi direction finder was a type of radio direction finder that was widely used from World War I to World War II. It used the signals from two crossed antennas, or four individual antennas simulating two crossed ones, to re-create the radio signal in a small area between two loops of wire. The operator could then measure the angle to the target radio source by performing direction finding within this small area. The advantage to the Bellini–Tosi system is that the antennas do not move, allowing them to be built at any required size.

The basic technique remains in use, although the equipment has changed dramatically. Goniometers are widely used for military and civil purposes, e.g. interception of satellite and naval communications on the French warship Dupuy de Lôme uses multiple goniometers.

=== Crystallography ===
In crystallography, goniometers are used for measuring angles between crystal faces. They are also used in X-ray diffraction to rotate the samples. The groundbreaking investigations of physicist Max von Laue and colleagues into the atomic structure of crystals in 1912 involved a goniometer.

=== Light measurement ===
Goniophotometers measure the spatial distribution of light visible to the human eye (often luminous intensity) at specific angular positions, usually covering all spherical angles.

=== In medicine ===
A goniometer is used to document initial and subsequent range of motion, at visits for occupational injuries, and by disability evaluators to determine a permanent disability. This is to evaluate progress and for medico-legal purposes. It is a tool to evaluate Waddell's signs (findings that may indicate symptom magnification.)

=== Rehabilitative therapy ===
In physical therapy, occupational therapy, orthotics and prosthetics, and athletic training, a goniometer measures range of motion of limbs and joints of the body. These measurements help accurately track progress in a rehabilitation program. When a patient has decreased range of motion, a therapist assesses the joint before performing an intervention and continues to use the tool to monitor progress. The therapist can take these range of motion measurements at any joint. They typically require knowledge about the anatomy of the body, particularly bony landmarks. For example, when measuring the knee joint, the therapist places the axis (point of rotation) on the lateral epicondyle of the femur, and lines up the stationary arm with the greater trochanter of the femur. Finally, the therapist lines up the moveable arm of the goniometer with the lateral malleolus of the fibula, and records a measurement using the degree scale on the circular portion of the tool. Reading accuracy is sometimes a problem with goniometers. Issues with the intra-measure (between measures) and inter-tester (between clinicians) reliability may increase as the experience of the examiner decreases. Some studies suggest that these errors can be anywhere between 5 and 10 degrees.

These goniometers come in different forms that some argue increase reliability. The universal standard goniometer is a plastic or metal tool with 1 degree increments. The arms are usually not longer than 12 inches, so it can be hard to accurately pinpoint the exact landmark for measurement. The telescopic-armed goniometer is more reliable—with a plastic circular axis like a classic goniometer, but with arms that extend to as long as two feet in either direction.

More recently in the twenty-first century, smartphone application developers have created mobile applications that provide the functions of a goniometer. These applications (such as Knee Goniometer and Goniometer Pro) use the accelerometers in phones to calculate joint angles. Recent research supports these applications and their devices as reliable and valid tools with as much accuracy as a universal goniometer.

Modern rehabilitative therapy motion capture systems perform goniometry at the least measuring active range of motion. While in some cases accuracy may be inferior to a goniometer, measuring angles with a motion capture system is superior at measuring during dynamic, as opposed to static, situations. Furthermore, using a traditional goniometer takes valuable time. In the clinical context, performing manual measurements takes valuable time and may not be practical.

=== Surface science ===
==== Contact angle goniometer ====
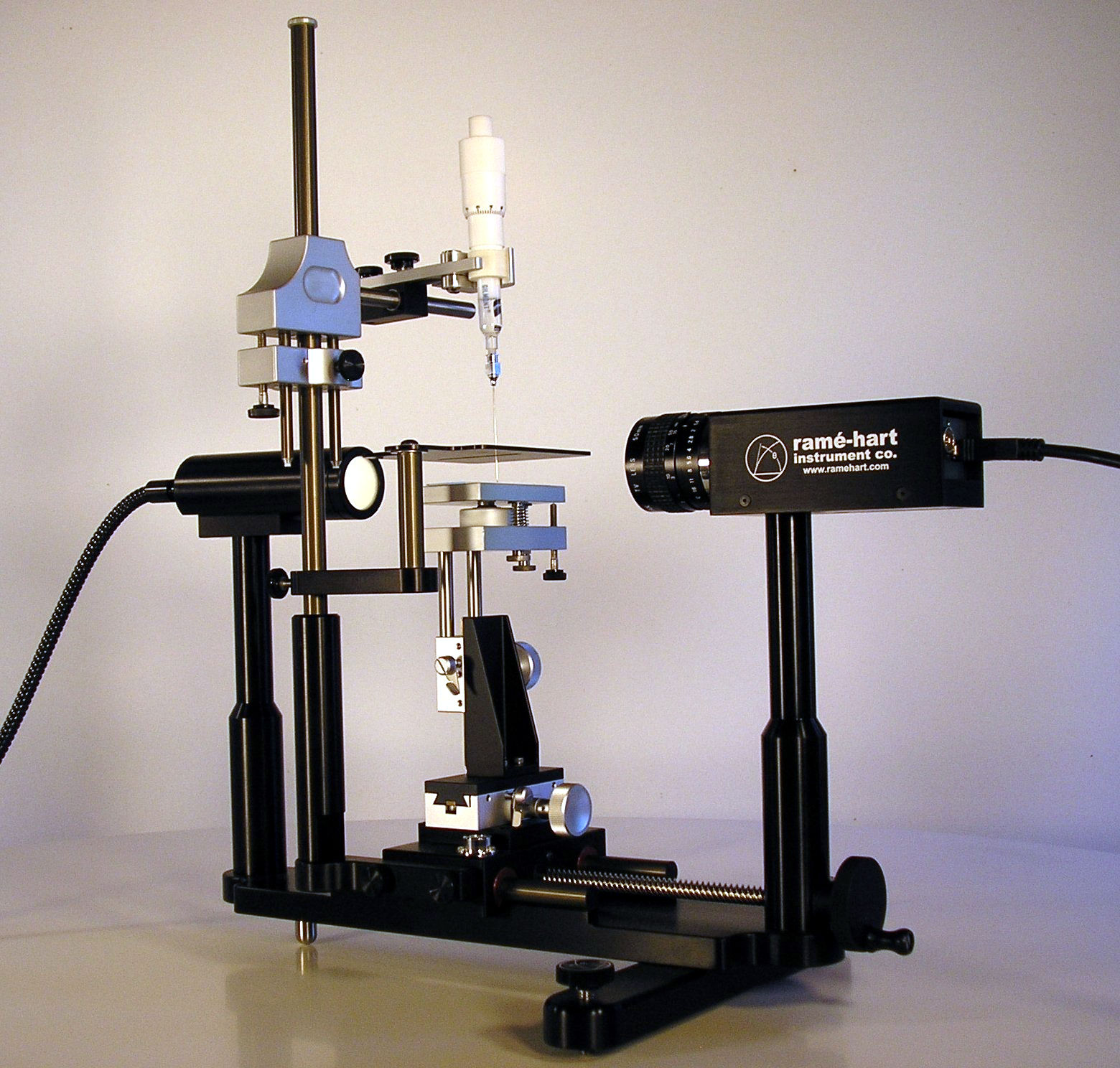
Surface scientists use a contact angle goniometer to measure contact angle, surface energy and surface tension.

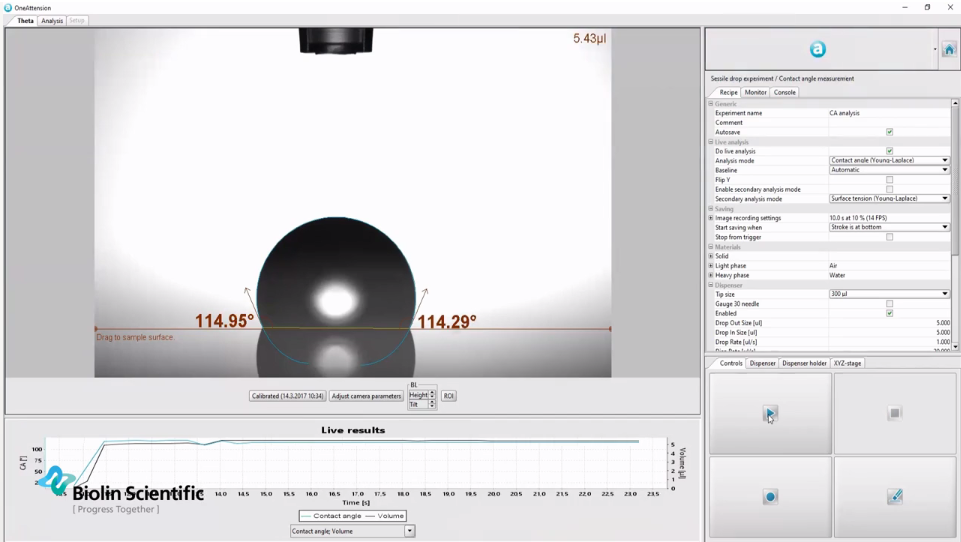
In a contact angle measurement, the angle between the droplet and solid surface indicates the wettability of the surface.

In surface science, an instrument called a contact angle goniometer or tensiometer measures the static contact angle, advancing and receding contact angles, and sometimes surface tension. The first contact angle goniometer was designed by William Zisman of the United States Naval Research Laboratory in Washington, D.C. and manufactured by ramé-hart (now ramé-hart instrument company), New Jersey, USA. The original manual contact angle goniometer used an eyepiece with a microscope. Today's contact angle goniometer uses a camera and software to capture and analyze the drop shape, and is better suited for dynamic and advanced studies.

==== Surface tension ====
Surface tension exists because the molecules inside a liquid experience roughly equal cohesive forces in all directions, but molecules at the surface experience larger attractive forces toward the liquid than toward gas.

Contact angle goniometers can also determine the surface tension for any liquid in gas or the interfacial tension between any two liquids. If the difference in densities between the two fluids is known, the surface tension or interfacial tension can be calculated by the pendant drop method. An advanced instrument often called a goniometer / tensiometer includes software tools that measure surface tension and interfacial tension using the pendant drop, inverted pendant drop, and sessile drop methods, in addition to contact angle. A centrifugal adhesion balance relates the contact angles to the adhesion of the drop to the surface. A gonioreflectometer measures the reflectivity of a surface at a number of angles.

=== Positioning ===
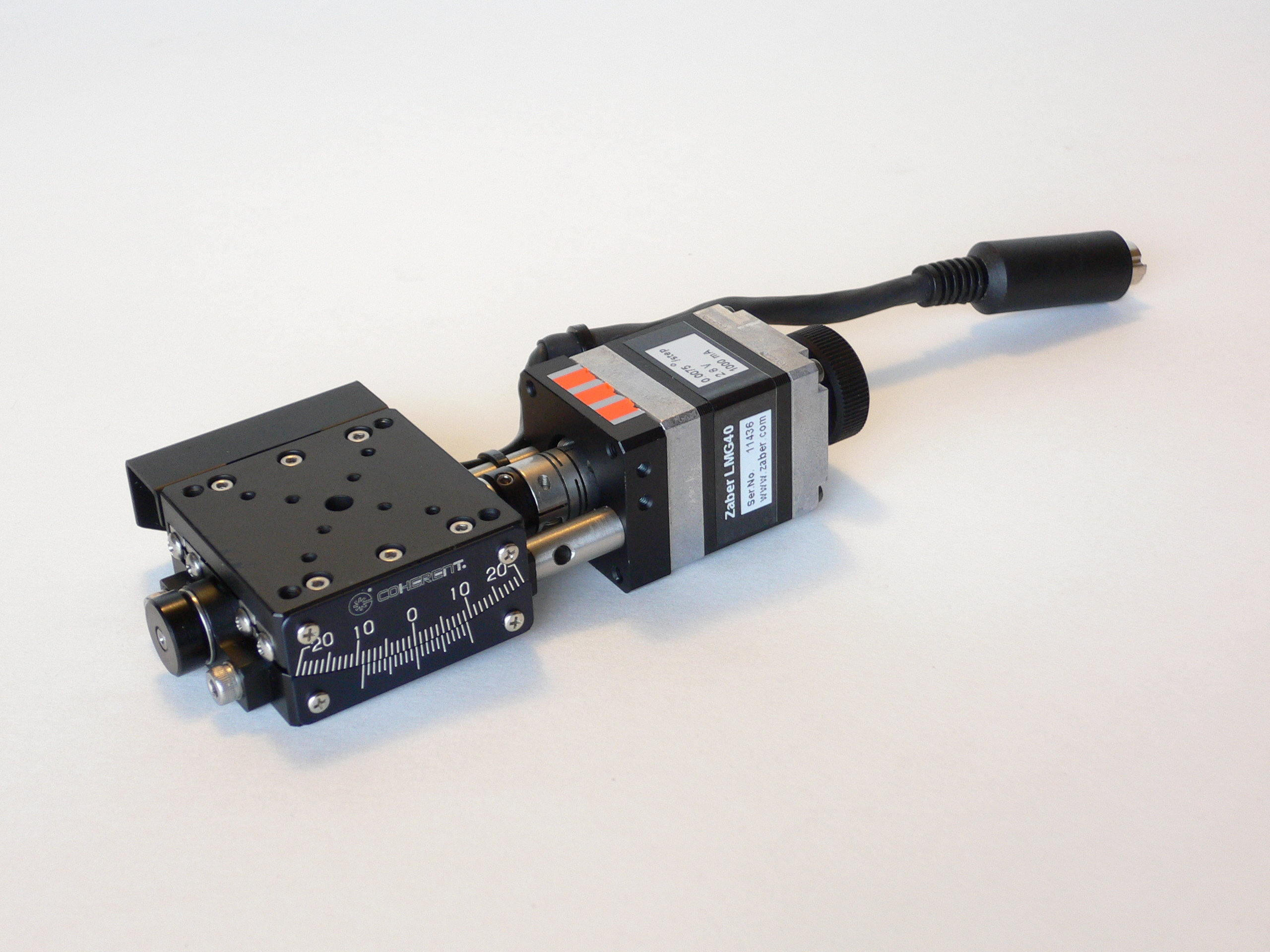
A miniature electro-mechanical goniometer stage. This type of stage is used primarily in the field of lasers and optics.

A positioning goniometer or goniometric stage is a device that rotates an object precisely about a fixed axis in space. It is similar to a linear stage: however, rather than moving linearly relative to its base, the stage platform rotates partially about a fixed axis above the mounting surface of the platform. Positioning goniometers typically use a worm drive with a partial worm wheel fixed to the underside of the stage platform meshing with a worm in the base. The worm gear may be rotated manually or by a motor in automated positioning systems.

=== Knife and blade cutting edge angle measurement ===
The included cutting angles of all kinds of sharp edge blades are measured using a laser reflecting goniometer. Developed by the Cutlery and Allied Trades Research Association (CATRA) in the UK, a range of devices can accurately determine the cutting edge profile, including a rounding of the tip to ½°. The included angle of a blade is important in controlling its cutting ability and edge strength—i.e., a low angle makes a thin sharp edge optimized for cutting softer materials, while a large angle makes a thick edge that is less sharp but stronger, which may be better for cutting harder materials.

=== Doctor blade inspection ===
Used doctor blades, from gravure and other printing and coating processes, can be inspected with a goniometer, typically with a built-in light source, to examine the blade edge for wear and correct angles. A difference in angle from that set on the machine may indicate excessive pressure, and a range of angles ("rounding") probably indicates a lack of stiffness, or wear, in the blade holder assembly.

== See also ==
- Birkhoff's axioms – Theoretical framework for planar Euclidean geometry
- Centiturn – Unit of plane angle where a full circle equals 1s
- Compass (drawing tool) – Drafting instrument for drawing circles or arcs
- French curve – Template made from metal, wood or plastic composed of segments of smooth curves
- Inclinometer – Instrument used to measure the inclination of a surface relative to local gravity
- Instrumentation – Measuring instruments which monitor and control a process
- Romer (tool) – Cartographic measuring tool
- SCR-277
- Sliding T bevel – Tool used to mark angles in woodworking
- Technical drawing tools – Tools and instruments used for accurate and precise manual drafting
- Trigonometry – Area of geometry, about angles and lengths
