= Sliding T bevel =

Tool used to mark angles in woodworking

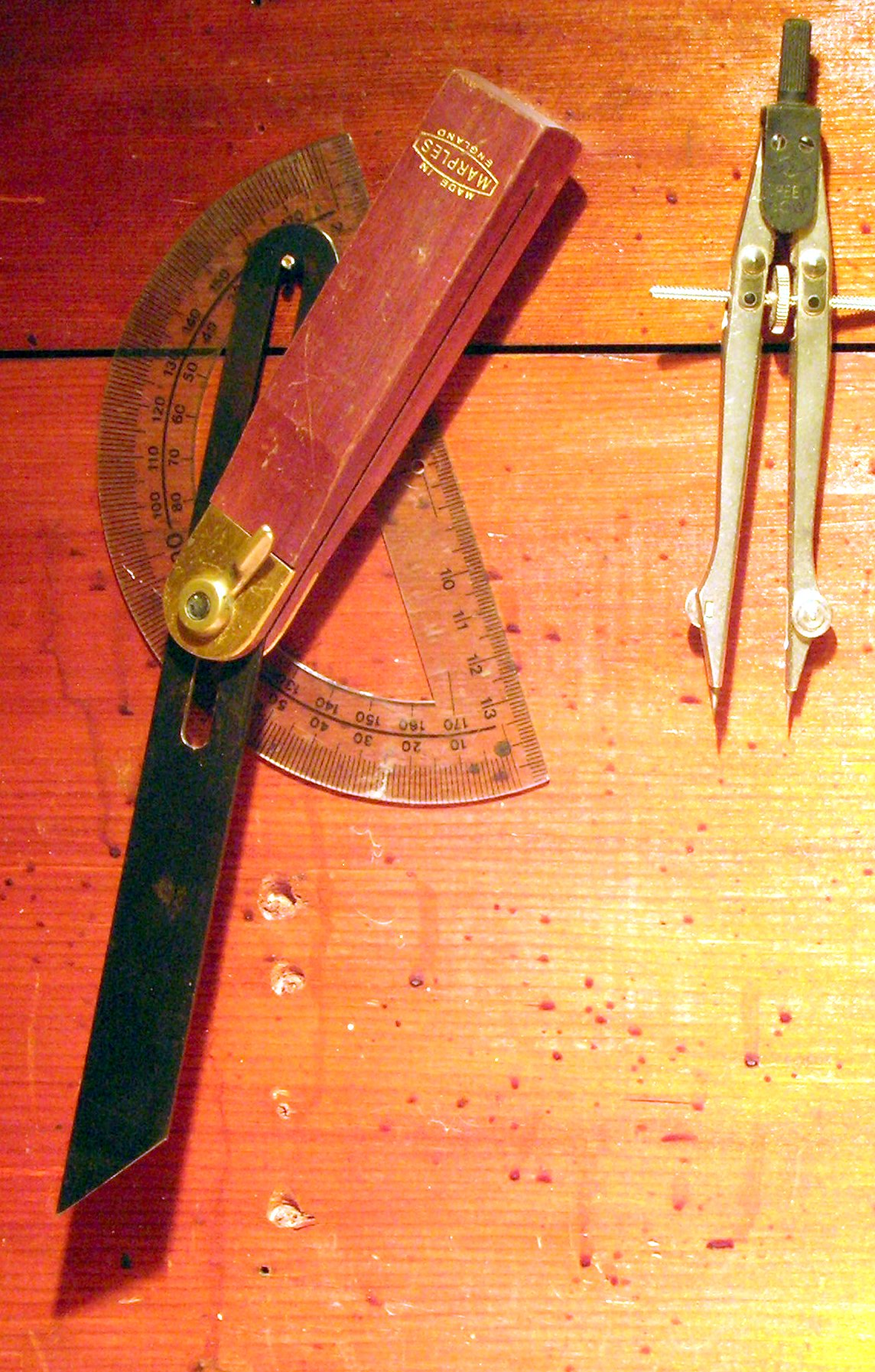
T bevel with protractor and dividers

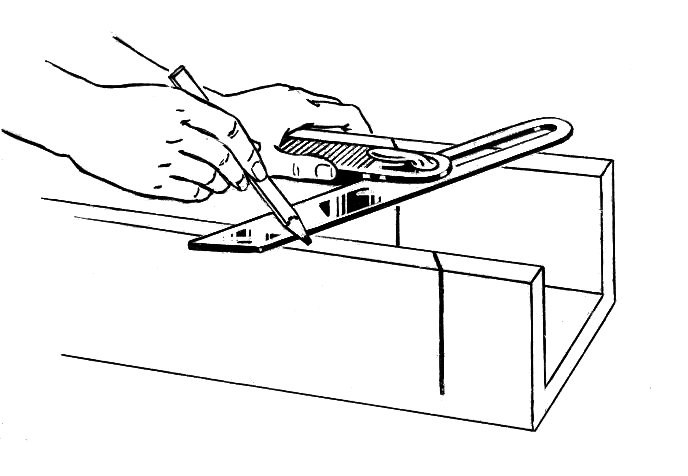
In use

A sliding T bevel, also known as a bevel gauge or false square is an adjustable carpentry and metalworking gauge for setting and transferring angles as well as drawing parallel lines. Different from the square, which is fixed and can only set a 90° angle, the sliding T bevel can set any angle and transfer it on another piece.

The bevel gauge is composed of two elements connected with a thumbscrew or wing nut, which allows the blade to pivot and be locked at any angle, much like the legs of a compass. The handle is usually made of wood or plastic and the blade of metal. The handle is held against the workpiece, while the blade is used for marking. Larger versions may be used in construction.

The bevel can be used to duplicate an existing angle, or set to a desired angle by using it with any number of other measuring tools (such as a protractor, or framing square).

== See also ==
- Bevel
- Miter square

== Sources ==
- Reader's Digest "Book of Skills & Tools"
