= Cutlery and Allied Trades Research Association =

Research and technology organisation in Sheffield, England

CATRA
- Formation: 1952; 74 years ago
- Purpose: Technical organisation for kitchenware, cutlery, knife and blade manufacturers, retailers and users
- Location: Henry Street, Sheffield, United Kingdom
- Region served: Worldwide
- Website: www.catra.org

The Cutlery and Allied Trades Research Association (CATRA) is an internationally known research and technology organisation in Sheffield, England which specialises in knives, cutlery, tableware, metallic holloware (such as pans), shaving razors, industrial knives, blades and garden tools.

== History ==
CATRA was originally set up by the British Government in 1952 to carry out developments for the UK's cutlery and knife industries, for which the area of Sheffield in Yorkshire is world-famous.

CATRA has developed a range of unique machines for measuring the cutting performance of all types of cutting edges from razor blades to large knives used in machinery and for testing of blade performance in general.

Since the 1980s CATRA has become an internationally recognised (60% export, CATRA published accounts 2013) cutting technology organisation, supplying consultancy, testing services and knife/blade making and testing equipment to manufacturers, developers, designers, users and retailers.

== Aims ==
CATRA's aim is to provide manufacturers, retailers and users of all types of cutting implements with independent technical experts that can advise, carry out product comparisons/tests and develop blade, knife and cutting technologies.

== Services ==
The association has a wealth of knowledge which is available to everyone on a competitive fee paying basis, however CATRA will enter into dialogue with consumers and users of cutlery, knives and tools where their expertise may be of help, on a free of charge basis. Petersen's Bowhunting magazine uses CATRA to measure sharpness of arrowheads.

== Products ==
CATRA manufactures a wide range of special purpose equipment including knife and cutlery testing machines and knife sharpening systems including the CATRAHONE and CATRASHARP machines.
