= Bevel =

Edge of a structure that is not perpendicular to the faces of the piece

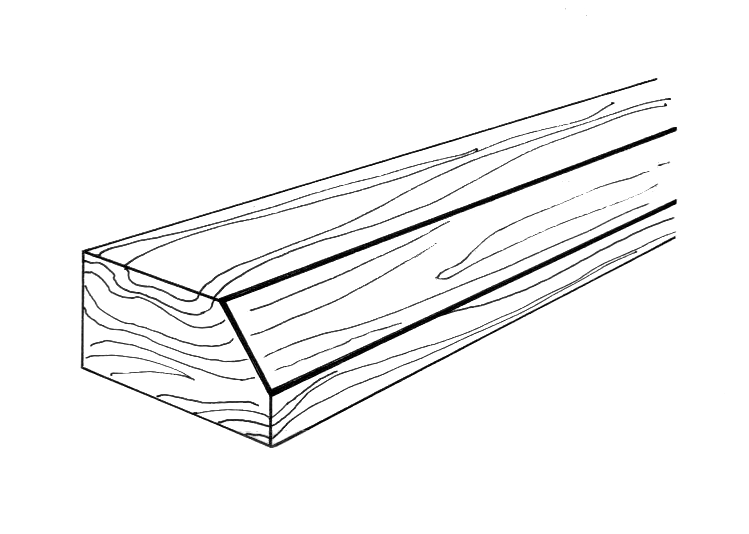

Side views of a bevel (above) and a chamfer (below)

A bevelled edge (UK) or beveled edge (US) is an edge of a structure that is not perpendicular to the faces of the piece. The words bevel and chamfer overlap in usage; in general usage, they are often interchanged, while in technical usage, they may be differentiated as shown in the image on the right. A bevel is typically used to soften the edge of a piece for the sake of safety, wear resistance, aesthetics; or to facilitate mating with another piece.

== Applications ==
=== Cutting tools ===
Most cutting tools have a bevelled edge which is apparent when one examines the grind.

Bevel angles can be duplicated using a sliding T bevel.

=== Graphic design ===
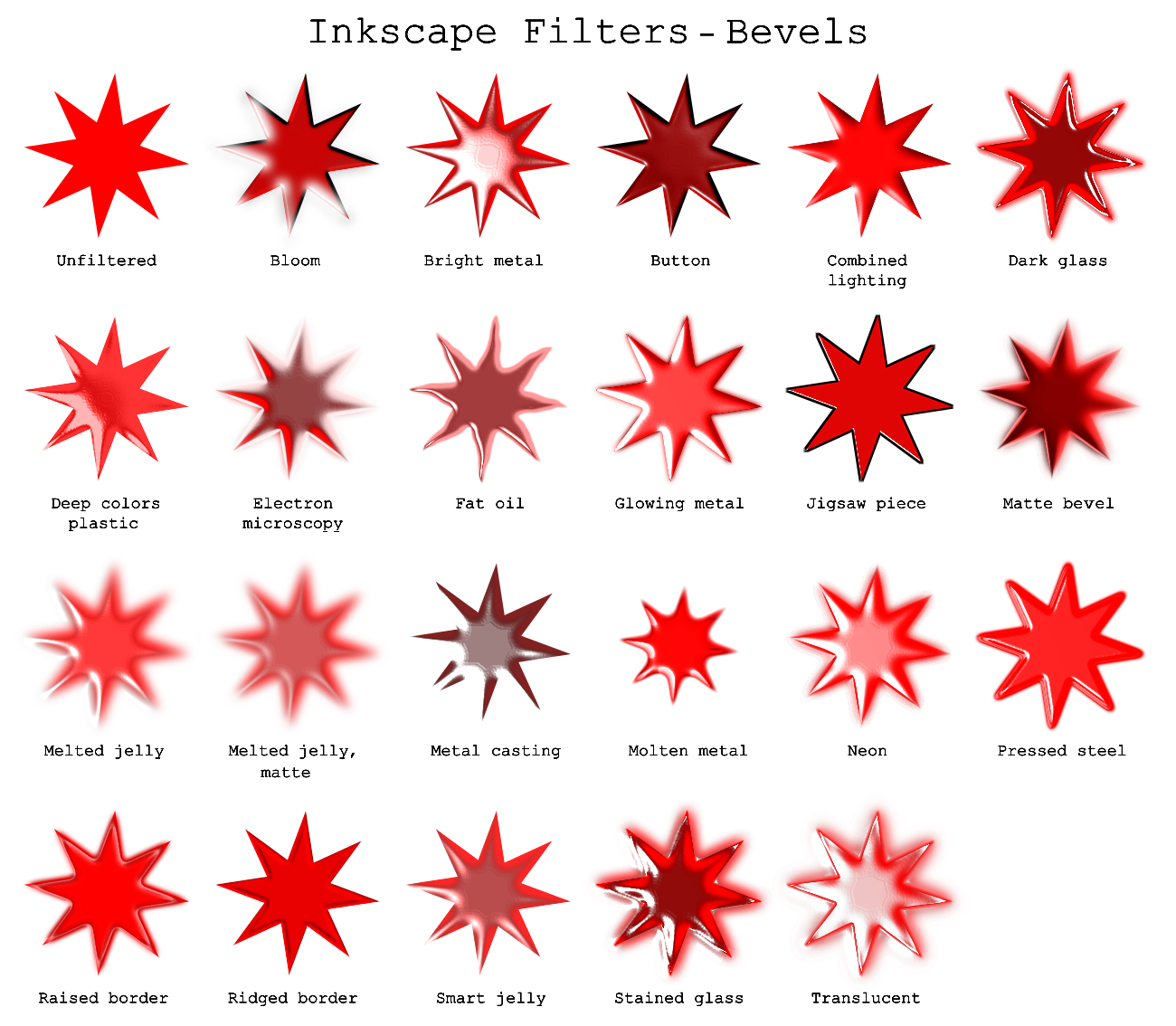
Bevel filters in Inkscape

Typographic bevels are shading and artificial shadows that emulate the appearance of a 3-dimensional letter. The bevel is a relatively common effect in graphic editors such as Photoshop. As such, it is in widespread use in mainstream logos and other design elements.

== Glass and mirrors ==
Bevelled edges are a common aesthetic nicety added to window panes and mirrors.

== Geology ==
Geologists refer to any slope of land into a stratum of different elevation as a bevel.

== Sports ==
In waterskiing, a bevel is the transition area between the side of the ski and the bottom of the ski. Beginners tend to prefer round bevels, which allow the ski to glide on the water surface.

In Disc Golf, the 'beveled edge' was patented in 1983 by Dave Dunipace who founded Innova Champion Discs. This element transformed the Frisbee into the further-flying golf discs the sport uses today.

== Cards ==
With a deck of cards, the top portion can be slid back so that the back of the deck is at an angle, a technique used in card tricks.

== Semiconductor wafers ==
In the semiconductor industry, wafers have two typical edge types: a slanted beveled shape or a rounded bullet shape. The edges on the beveled types are called the bevel region, and they are typically ground at a 22-degree angle. While it is not possible to create a complete and functional die with the bevel material of a wafer, the area is still routinely processed throughout the manufacturing cycle to remove unwanted masks, residues, and films from the edge of a wafer that could potentially become a source of defects between manufacturing steps.

== Welding ==
Beveling and chamfering (along with other profiles) are applied to thicker pieces of metal prior to welding, see Welding joint#V-joints. The bevel provides a smooth clean edge to the plate or pipe and allows a weld of the correct shape (to prevent center-line cracking) to join the separate pieces of metal.

Simple bevels can be used with a backup strip (thin removable sheet behind the plate joint) with chamfers (and a small land) being used on open root welds. Particularly thick plate will have a J-shaped chamfer or U-shaped groove to reduce the amount of welding filler metal used.

Cruciform joint preparation can involve a double bevel to permit full penetration of each weld to the other, removing a possible void space in the center.
