= 7554 =

2011 video game

- Developer: Emobi Games
- Publisher: Emobi Games
- Engine: Vision
- Platform: Microsoft Windows
- Release: December 16, 2011
- Genre: First-person shooter
- Mode: Single-player

7554: Glorious Memories Revived (Vietnamese: 7554: Sống lại những ký ức hào hùng) is a first-person shooter video game developed by Vietnamese video game developer Emobi Games for Windows. It was released for Vietnamese markets on December 16, 2011.

The game is set during the Franco-Vietnamese War from 1946 to 1954. The title is a reference to May 7, 1954, which was the date of the Việt Minh's victory over France at the Battle of Dien Bien Phu.

Although the website is currently down, the game can still be downloaded from a Wayback Machine capture.

== Gameplay ==
The player assumes the role of a Việt Minh soldier during the First Indochina War. Many gameplay features seen in contemporary FPS games such as Call of Duty have been replicated in 7554.

The player can only carry up to two firearms plus a melee weapon and hand grenades. Different weapons and ammo can be picked up from fallen soldiers and other locations while fixed weapon emplacements can also be used. The heads-up display shows an ammo counter and a stance icon. The player can crouch and lie prone (but cannot move and shoot at the same time), and is able to scale low walls and other obstacles.

If the player sustains damage, the screen will gradually turn red and the sound of the character's heartbeat will increase in volume, indicating low health. As a result, players should find safe cover to crouch or lie prone to restore their health. A grenade icon shows the player the direction and proximity of grenades about to explode. They can also die if they are too close to any explosions. A number of AI non-player characters are also available to assist the player but they cannot be issued commands.

The weapons used in the game are based on actual weapons the Việt Minh used during the war. Some, including the Arisaka rifle were sourced from Japanese armories captured after the Japanese surrender following World War II.

A screenshot from the third mission, "Bare Feet, Steel Will". Taking place in December 1952, the Việt Minh ambush a French convoy. The player character holds a crossbow as a primary weapon.

== Plot ==
=== Characters ===
The player-character initially assumes the role of Hoàng Đăng Bình, a Việt Minh soldier who gets caught up in the war. He is joined by heavy weapons specialist Nguyễn Thế Vinh, marksman Lưu Trọng Hà, and anti-aircraft specialist Hoàng Đăng An (who is also Bình's younger brother). Over the course of the game, the player perspective switches between each of the four men.

=== Story ===
The game begins with a historical exposition of French rule over Indochina from 1858 until the outbreak of the Franco-Vietnamese War in 1946.

At the start of the game, Binh answers the Vietnamese leadership's call to arms against the French. He joins the defense of the Metropole Hanoi from French forces during the Battle of Hanoi. As he links up with Hà and Vinh, the French wear down the defenses and assault the hotel at night. Vietnamese forces head to the mountains to launch a guerrilla war. Now part of the Việt Minh's 204th regiment in October 1950, Binh's team is assigned to attack a French fort astride Route Coloniale 4 and rescue captured prisoners. The troops fight their way to the town of Đông Khê as French forces pull out. Vinh is later assigned to the 9th Infantry Regiment as it ambushes a French column out of Hòa Bình in December 1952. However, one of the tanks slips through the cordon and seemingly kills Binh. With his last breath, Binh asks Vinh to give him a letter to his family as Vinh later destroys the tank.

Several months later, in late 1953, General Võ Nguyên Giáp's assaults into Laos later results in Gen Henri Navarre replacing Raoul Salan and advocating a new defensive strategy. An joins the 148th regiment in the attack on Dien Bien Phu as the French launches Operation Castor. An later laments that Binh, who recovered to join an attack on Giang Mo, has not been heard from since he was relocated to a military hospital in the rear.

The Dien Bien Phu siege finally begins in March 1954 and An is reassigned to the 316th Division for the initial assault. French troops attack in an attempt to silence the 316th's artillery positions in a hill east of the camp, but are heavily repelled within hours; the hill is later named the "Hill of Medals". Vinh, meanwhile, is part of the attack force on Beatrice; the success of the attack leads to the fall of Gabrielle and Ban Keo within days. An, who was present at the Hill of Medals, helps in the defense of Gabrielle against French airstrikes. Ha is with the 304th Division as part of sniper teams attacking Isabelle. Binh is assigned to a commando raid on a French airbase to disrupt air support missions to Dien Bien Phu. Vinh is part of the troops attacking Eliane 1 and participates in the brutal fighting over the hill (where he is either KIA or WIA after destroying a tank).

Binh returns to the Dien Bien Phu front on May 6 as the Việt Minh begin their final assault, starting with a dynamite blast on Eliane 2. In the midst of the battle, Binh briefly reunites with Ha before heading back into action, but Ha is later killed. During the final attack, Binh unexpectedly reunites with An and learns about their mother's death. Binh's team captures a French soldier and forces him to point out Col Christian de Castries' command bunker, but French troops open fire and An is hit in the process as he encourages his comrades to rush the bunker. Binh kills the soldiers and later holds An in his arms. An apologizes to Binh before he passes away (later on he is confirmed alive by the developer). Other soldiers start herding away French troops and a soldier raises the Vietnamese Yellow Star flag over the bunker.

== Development ==
Emobi Games started the project in October 2008 amidst relative secrecy. The development team used Havok's Vision Engine 8 graphics engine, NVidia's PhysX physics engine, and Xaitment's XaitMap and XaitControl AI programs to create the game. Despite the high system requirements such programs needed, the development team optimized the game to run on systems with much lower hardware configurations.

To lend authenticity to the game, Vietnam's cultural authorities provided the researchers with information on Việt Minh and French actions during the war.

A video depicting early gameplay footage was released on April 1, 2010, but was given little attention due to being April Fool's Day. A trailer that confirmed the existence of the game was released on May 7. A demo video of the project, showing the siege of the Hanoi Metropole Hotel in December 1946, was shown in September. Another trailer was introduced in June 2011.

=== Release ===
The game was released for the Vietnamese market on December 16, 2011. It was later translated for Western release on July 20, 2012. The export version features the original Vietnamese audio track.

== Reception ==
The game received mostly negative reviews. Metacritic reported 2 mixed and 5 negative reviews. Chris Watters of GameSpot graded the game at 3.5/10, stating that it lacks many hallmarks expected of modern-day first-person shooter video games. In the Vietnamese market, the game received the 2012 Reader's Choice Award from PC World Vietnam.
