= Harley-Davidson: Wheels of Freedom =

2000 video game

- Developers: Canopy Games, G2M Games
- Publisher: Infogrames, Inc.
- Platform: Microsoft Windows
- Release: NA: November 7, 2000
- Genre: Racing
- Modes: Single-player, multiplayer

Harley-Davidson: Wheels of Freedom is a racing game developed by Canopy Games and G2M Games, and published by Infogrames in 2000.

== Gameplay ==
Screenshot showing a "checkpoint rally" race taking place.

Building upon the earlier Race Across America, Harley-Davidson: Wheels of Freedom lets players take part in various motorcycle rally events across the United States. Events new to the game are checkpoint-based rally stages, similar to Motocross Madness and Midnight Club, along with a poker run game mode where besides winning the race itself, the player has to have the best poker hand at the end of each run. As with earlier Harley-Davidson games, Wheels of Freedom employs a number of motorcycles from the company—models such as the Harley-Davidson Fat Boy return, along with the addition of the Softail Deuce, Dyna Wide Glide and Night Train. In contrast to the linear, point-to-point stages in Race Across America, Wheels of Freedom is open-ended in nature, with open world checkpoint stages and circuits and the ability to choose events at their own leisure.

Other improvements include the addition of the Havok physics engine with ragdoll physics and new character animations, making it possible for player character to separate from the motorcycle upon colliding with scenery or an opponent. Also included is the integration of GameSpy's matchmaking service, allowing players to join or host multiplayer sessions more easily as opposed to the multiplayer component in the previous game which was criticized for being cumbersome to use.

== Reception ==
Reception to Wheels of Freedom was mixed. Reviewers noted improvements over the previous game, but complained about the game's AI and technical issues. The multiplayer component was also put into question, mainly due to sparse player counts in spite of its use of a matchmaking service and limited options.

Stephen Poole of GameSpot said, "If you're looking for high-performance motorcycle racing on the PC, you'll tap this one out in very short order.". They awarded the game a score of 5.3 (mediocre). In a similarly mixed review, Vincent Lopez of IGN noted the graphical improvements over the previous game, its open-ended structure and the inclusion of GameSpy Arcade, but criticized its erratic AI and easy difficulty, saying "If, perhaps, you enjoy spending your money on things of value, such as say... well, any other game on the market, than you should probably take the twenty bucks and get yourself Superbike 2001, or at least something a little more valuable."

A more positive review came from Shawn Snider of GamingExcellence, who deemed it "a very large step up from its predecessor", yet noted the game's easy difficulty and poor vehicle handling.
