= Xaitment =

German artificial intelligence company

xaitment GmbH
- Founded: Germany (2004)
- Founder: Dr. Andreas Gerber
- Headquarters: Quierschied, Germany
- Key people: Mike Walsh (CEO)
- Products: xaitMap, xaitMap for Unity, xaitControl, xaitControl for Unity (software), xaitMove, xaitKnow, xaitThink
- Subsidiaries: xaitment Inc. (California-based)
- Website: www.xaitment.com

xaitment was a German-based company that developed and sold artificial intelligence (AI) software to video game developers and simulation developers. The company was founded in 2004 by Dr. Andreas Gerber, and was a spin-off of the German Research Centre for Artificial Intelligence, or DFKI. xaitment had its main office in Quierschied, Germany, and field offices in the United States, England, China, Korea, and Japan.

In 2013, xaitment was acquired by and merger into iOpener Media.

== History ==
In February 2008, xaitment announced it would begin work with Factor 5 for the implementation of xaitment's xaitEngine in Factor 5's then yet-to-be-announced multi-platform title.

In August 2007, xaitment opened an American office in San Rafael, California.

In July 2009, xaitment released xaitMap 2.5, an update to its navigation mesh-oriented AI software that included geometry tagging, batched builds, a project wizard, pathfinding objects, and a redesigned user interface. That same month, it was announced that xaitment's xaitEngine AI would be integrated with Emergent's Gamebryo LightSpeed development platform.

In December 2009, xaitment announced its tools would be used by Hive Media, Inc. on a development project known as the Zombie Game Experiment. Funds from the project would benefit The Michael J. Fox Foundation for Parkinson's Research.

In March 2010, xaitment announced it would be expanding into the Asian market with the appointment of an Asian sales VP, David Brameas. The company also announce it would be partnering with Gamebase as the reseller and customer support provider for xaitment's tools in South Korea.

In May 2010, xaitment announced a licensing contract with Swadesh Animation, a game development company headquartered in then Bangalore, India.

In June 2010, xaitment announced a licensing agreement with game developer Alibangbang Digital Games, a subsidiary of Taiwanese game producer Gamania Digital Entertainment. Later that month, the company also announced a licensing agreement with Ulm, Germany-based TriCAT GmbH, a 3D virtual training and learning provider.

In October 2010, xaitment announced a licensing agreement with AQ Interactive. The Tokyo, Japan-based video game developer would use xaitment's xaitMap to develop its then-upcoming title for Xbox 360 and PlayStation 3 (PS3).

In August 2010, xaitment announced licensing agreements with Epiphany Games, an Australian game development studio, as well as Munich-based Coreplay and French studio Kylotonn. Also that month, the company received €2.4 million in investment funding. The funds came from the Triangle Venture Capital Group, with co-investment from ERP Startfonds.

In November 2010, IPKeys Technologies announced it would be using xaitment's technology for a training simulation for U.S. forces "to identify and avoid improvised explosive devices in the field".

In March 2011, xaitment announced its BrainPack 2011, a collection of the company's most-requested AI tools: xaitMap, xaitMove² and xaitControl. It would be available to indie studios at a lower cost. On month later, xaitment announced licensing agreements with Realmforge Studios, TML Studios, and Promotion Software—companies that had utilized xaitment's BrainPack 2011.

In June 2011, a licensing agreement between xaitment and Bohemia Interactive was announced, for the later's military simulation suite VBS2.

In July and August of 2011, xaitment launched upgrades to its core products: xaitMap, xaitControl, and BrainPack 2011.

In September 2011, xaitment received €1.2 million (about. $1.6 million USD) from two of its main investors, Triangle Venture Capital Group and the German state-owned bank, KfW.

On January 11, 2012, xaitment announced it was making its source code for its xaitMap and xaitControl modules available to "all current and future U.S. and European licensees".

On February 22, 2012, xaitment released two new plug-ins, xaitMap and xaitControl for the Unity Game Engine. The full versions were available for PC (Windows and Linux), PS3, Xbox 360, and Wii.

In April 2012, xaitment announced that, starting in May 2012, its xaitMap and xaitControl for Unity technology would be offered on mobile devices, including on iOS, Android, and the Unity Web Player.

In May 2012, xaitment was listed as a finalist for the 2012 Develop Industry Excellence Awards, included in the "Tools Provider" category along with Autodesk, Epic Games, Firelight Technologies, Hansoft, Havok, NaturalMotion, RAD Game Tools, and Unity Technologies.

In August 2012, xaitment partnered with Studica to help with distribution for xaitment's Unity plug-ins. Universities, other educational institutions, and students could get xaitMap and xaitControl for Unity at discounted prices.

In early-2013, xaitment announced XaitControl was available for PlayStation 4 (PS4) game makers, giving PS4 games "more lifelike AI".

In February 2013, xaitment was acquired by and merger into iOpener Media.

== Products ==
xaitment offered AI software modules and software development kits (SDKs) designed to help video game and simulation developers incorporate AI into their projects.

- xaitMap provides runtime libraries and graphical tools for navigation mesh generation (also called NavMesh generation), pathfinding, dynamic collision avoidance, and individual and crowd movement.
- xaitControl is a finite-state machine for game logic and character behavior modeling that also includes a real-time debugger.
- xaitMove is a performance movement solution for individuals and groups of characters based on nav meshes, including formation movement and crowd simulations, which allows developers to keep individuals and groups from colliding with each other, stationary objects, or moving objects.
- xaitKnow is an AI SDK that lets developers create knowledge modeling for the game world and manage the knowledge within it.
- xaitThink is an AI SDK that allows developers to create high-level behavior modeling for games.

== Leadership ==
Effective August 1, 2010, Markus Schneider was named chief executive officer (CEO) of xaitment Inc., the California-based subsidiary of xaitment GmbH. Schneider formerly served as Executive Vice President of Sales for the Americas and Asia. Company founder Dr. Andreas Gerber remained Group CEO of xaitment GmbH.

In August 2011, Mike Walsh, former VP of world sales at Havok, was appointed CEO of xaitment. Gerber would become chief operating officer (COO).

== Partners ==
xaitment's AI software was integrated into the Unity game engine, Havok's Vision Engine, Bohemia Interactive's VBS2 Simulation Engine, and GameBase's Gamebryo game engine.

== Customers ==
xaitment sold its AI software products to video game developers and military and civil simulation developers. Customers have included Tencent, Gamania, Realmforge Studios, Promotion Software, TML Studios, Emobi Games, IP Keys, Epiphany Games Coreplay, Kylotonn, and others.
