= Harley-Davidson Fat Boy =

V-twin softail cruiser motorcycle with solid-cast disc wheels

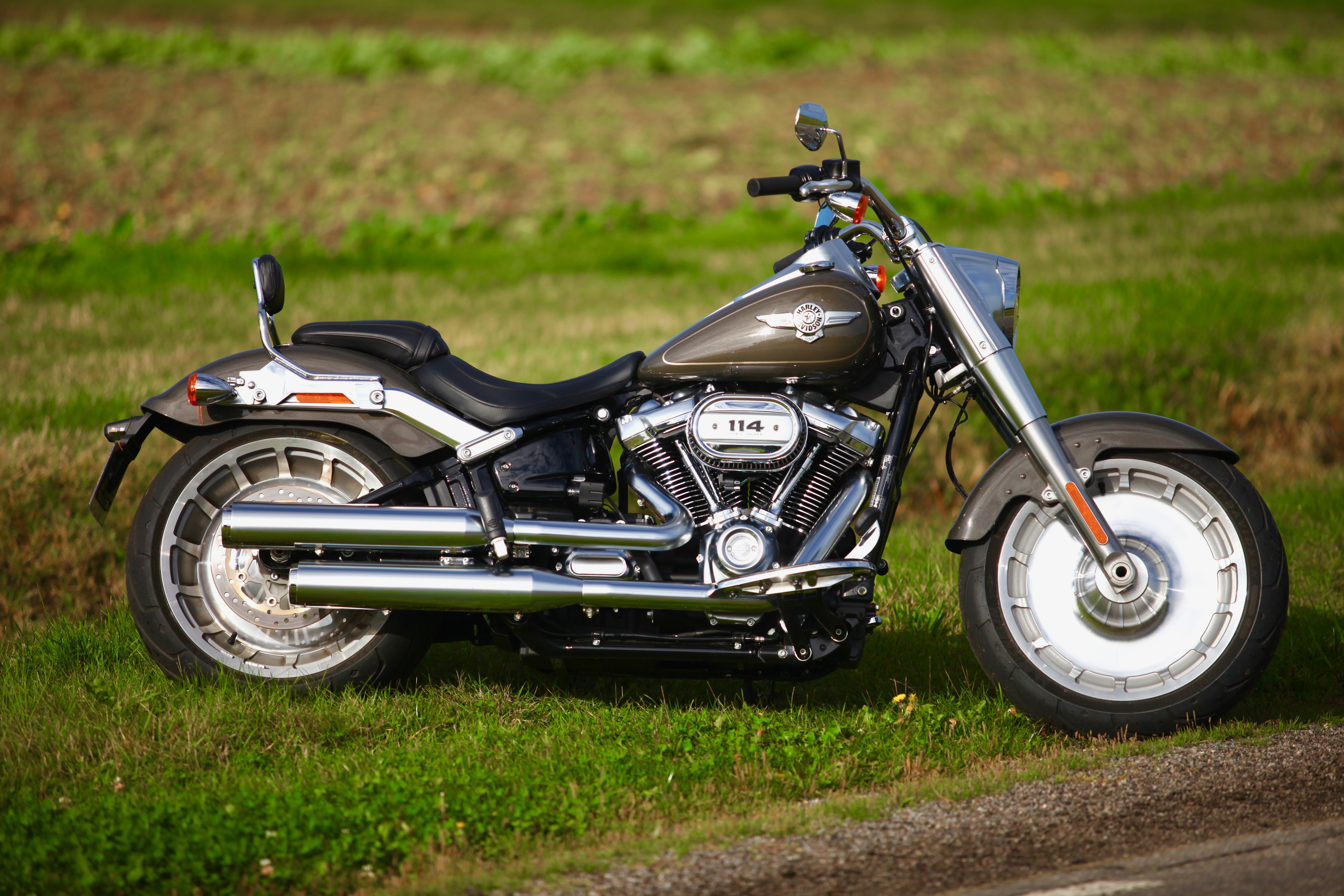
- Manufacturer: Harley-Davidson
- Production: Since 1990
- Class: Cruiser
- Engine: Evolution (1990–1999) 1,340 cc (82 cu in); Twin Cam (2000–2017) 1,450 cc (88 cu in) 1,584 cc (96.7 cu in) 1,690 cc (103 cu in); Milwaukee-Eight (2018–2019) 1,746 cc (107 cu in) 1,868 cc (114 cu in); (2020); 1,868 cc (114 cu in)
- Transmission: Chain (Primary) / Belt (final drive)
- Brakes: Disc/disc
- Wheelbase: 1,636 mm (64.4 in)

The Harley-Davidson Fat Boy, is a V-twin softail cruiser motorcycle with solid-cast disc wheels. Designed by Willie G. Davidson and Louie Netz, Harley-Davidson built a prototype Fat Boy in Milwaukee for the Daytona Bike Week rally at Daytona Beach in 1988 and 1989. Fat Boys produced from 1990 to 2017 are coded FLSTF, and FLFB (& FLFBS) from 2018.

An oft-repeated false etymology claims that the name comes from a contraction of Fat Man and Little Boy, the atomic bombs dropped on Japan during the end of World War II, as a symbolic insult to Japanese motorcycles. This has been debunked, as the name "Fat Boy" actually comes from the observation that the motorcycle is somewhat wider than other bikes when viewed head-on. In a 2015 interview, Scott Miller, Harley-Davidson's vice president of styling and product development, confirmed that the name was simply descriptive and had nothing to do with Harley's Japanese competitors.

== History and development ==
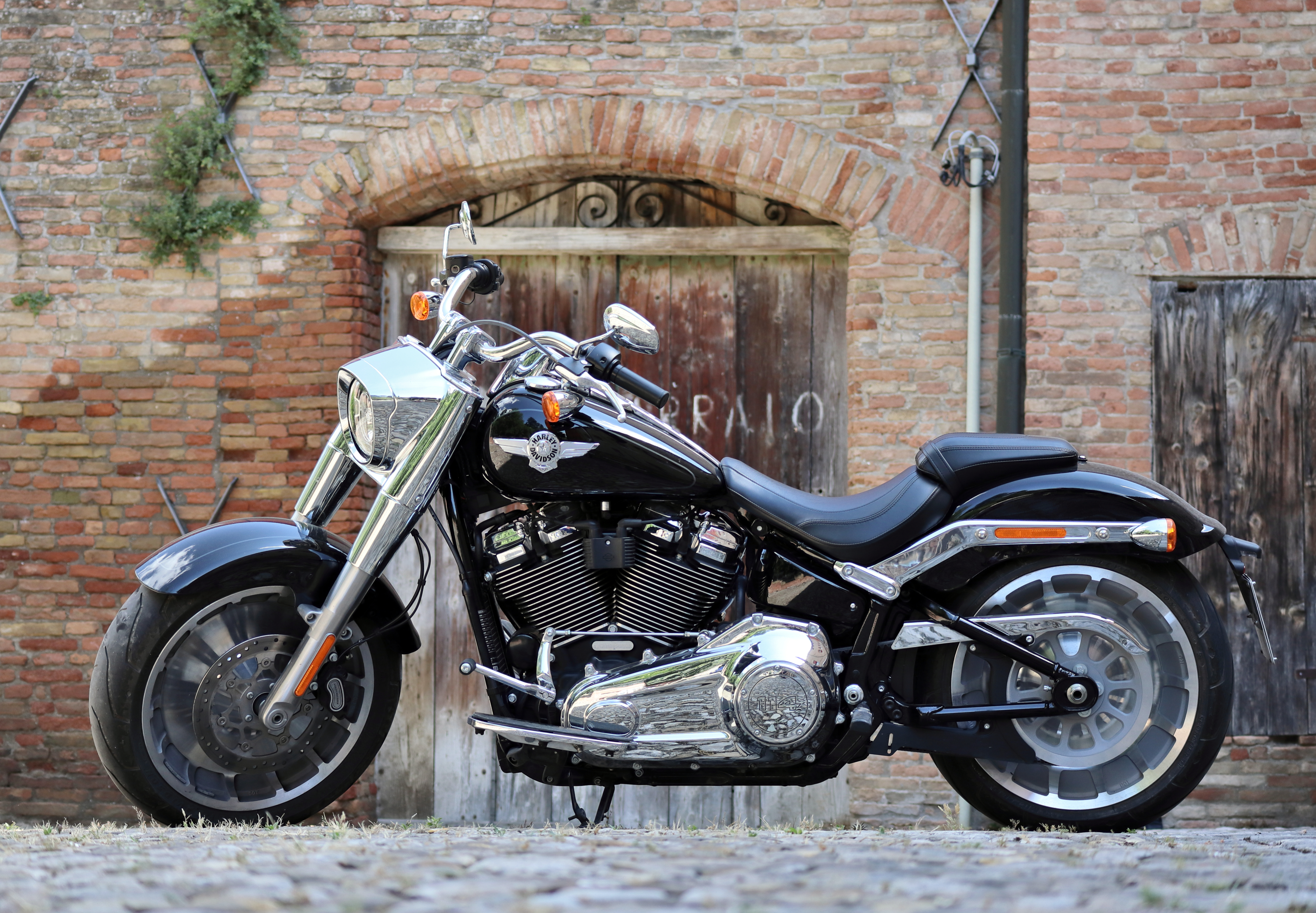
A FLFBS Fat Boy Lo 114, 2021

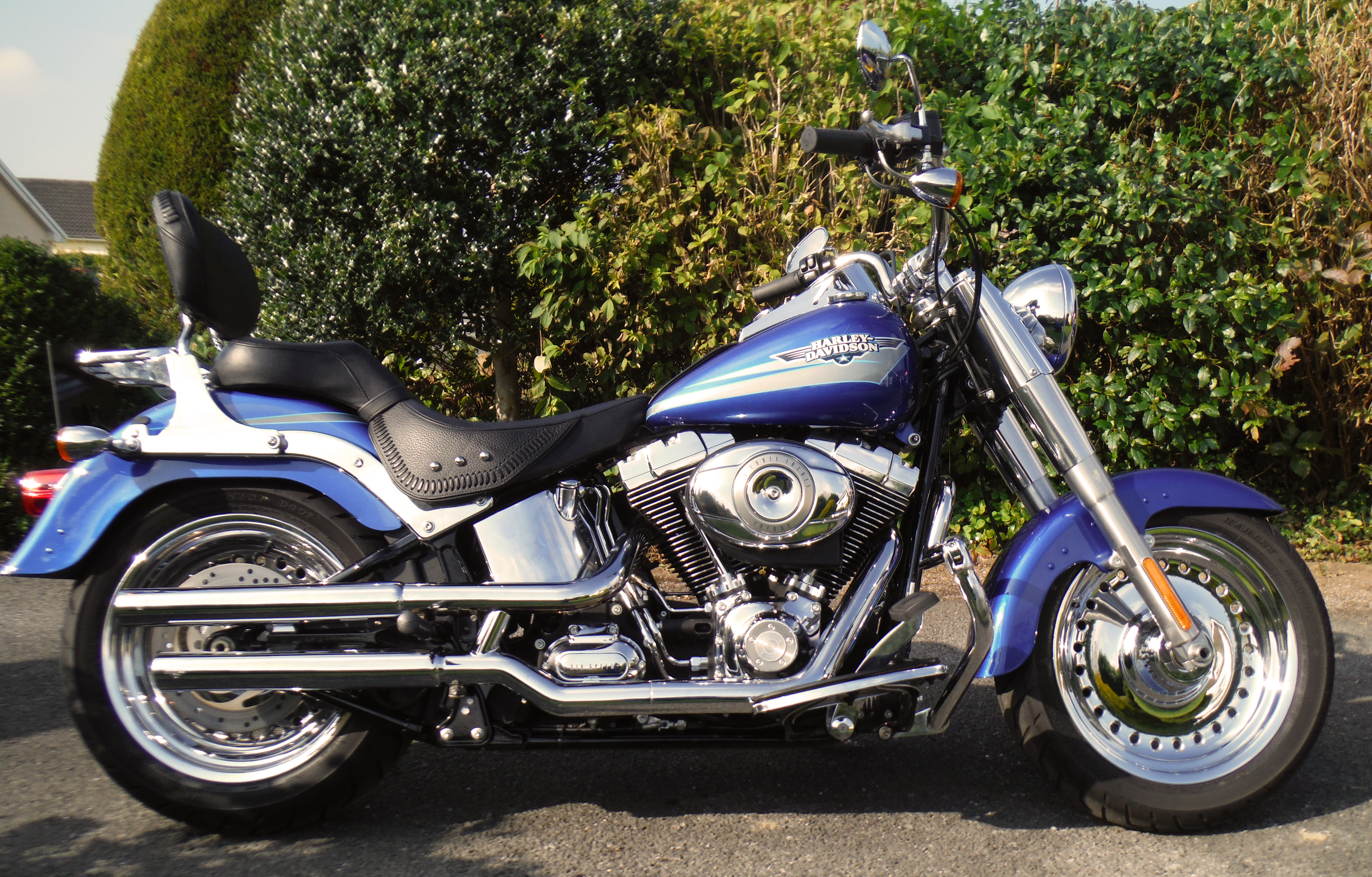
A FLSTF Fat Boy, 2016

In the mid-1970s, mechanical engineer Bill Davis designed and built a predecessor to the Softail and patented the design in 1976. Davis sold his patents, prototype, and tooling to Harley-Davidson in January 1982. The Fat Boy was one of numerous Harley-Davidson models built on the Softail frame.

- After 1994, the exhaust was made seamless.
- In 1996 the master cylinder and switch gear were revised.
- In 1999 a new 1,450 cc (88 cu in) Twin Cam engine for the 2000 model year was used. This necessitated a bespoke engine variant and changes to the frame.
- In 2002 bullet-style indicators, alarm and immobilizer were added.
- In 2005 a 15th Anniversary version was sold with a "Screamin' Eagle" engine, special paint and custom wheels.
- In 2007 the displacement was increased to 1,584 cc (96.7 cu in) and the transmission changed six speeds.
- The 2010 "Fat Boy Lo" FLSTFB had the lowest ever Harley seat height.
- In 2012 the Fat Boy received the new 1,690 cc (103 cu in) Twin Cam engine along with the rest of the softail range
- 2018 Fat Boys have a redesigned softail frame with Showa front and rear suspension and new twin-counterbalanced Milwaukee-Eight engines. The two 2018 variants comprise:
- FLFB 1,746 cc (107 cu in) with 109 lb⋅ft (148 N⋅m), and
- FLFBS 1,868 cc (114 cu in) with 119 lb⋅ft (161 N⋅m)

The 2018 Softail frame has a modified swingarm with a Showa rear monoshock suspension mounted beneath the seat, replacing earlier twin shocks. So as to provide a more comfortable and better controlled ride with improved handling, the front forks contain a Showa "Dual Bending Valve" (SDBV), a cartridge simulator using two valves to control compression and rebound damping, giving linear damping characteristics proportional to fork stroke speed. Harley-Davidson claims the 2018 chassis is stiffer and lighter than earlier Softail and Dyna platforms. Further upgrades include an LED headlight and 18-inch "Lakester" rims, with wider 160mm front and 240mm rear tires.

For 2020, the Fat Boy is only available with the Milwaukee-Eight 114 engine. Harley-Davidson also produced a 30th Anniversary edition for 2020.

For 2025, the Fat Boy received an upgraded powertrain with the Milwaukee-Eight 117 engine, a reworked rear suspension, driver safety enhancements, and appearance updates including new wheels. A limited serialized run of 1990 35th anniversary Fat Boy Grey Ghost was released as part of the Icons collection with model code FLSTFI. The Grey Ghost pays homage to the original 1990 model with various cosmetic enhancements, including a round air intake, yellow rockers, tank concho, and an exclusive “Reflection” color scheme.

It is one of Harley-Davidson's best selling models and has appeared prominently in a number of TV shows and movies. The Fat Boy earned a place in American pop culture after appearances in the movie Terminator 2: Judgment Day. One of the motorcycles used in Terminator 2 is displayed at the Harley-Davidson Museum. It appeared again in Terminator Genisys.

== See also ==
- List of Harley-Davidson motorcycles
