= List of 2007 box office number-one films in Canada =

This is a list of films which have placed number one at the weekend box office in Canada during 2007.

== Weekend gross list ==
| † | This implies the highest-grossing movie of the year. |

| # | Weekend End Date | Film | Weekend Gross (millions) | Notes |
|---|---|---|---|---|
| 1 | January 7, 2007 | Night at the Museum | $1.96 | |
| 2 | January 14, 2007 | Night at the Museum | $1.28 | Stomp the Yard was #1 in North America. |
| 3 | January 21, 2007 | Night at the Museum | $0.93 | Stomp the Yard was #1 in North America. |
| 4 | January 28, 2007 | Epic Movie | $1.32 | |
| 5 | February 4, 2007 | The Messengers | $1.06 | |
| 6 | February 11, 2007 | Norbit | $0.93 | |
| 7 | February 18, 2007 | Ghost Rider | $3.63 | |
| 8 | February 25, 2007 | The Number 23 | $1.58 | Ghost Rider was #1 in North America. |
| 9 | March 4, 2007 | Wild Hogs | $2.40 | |
| 10 | March 11, 2007 | 300 | $6.09 | |
| 11 | March 18, 2007 | 300 | $3.45 | |
| 12 | March 25, 2007 | 300 | $2.13 | TMNT was #1 in North America. |
| 13 | April 1, 2007 | Blades of Glory | $2.44 | |
| 14 | April 8, 2007 | Blades of Glory | $1.94 | |
| 15 | April 15, 2007 | Disturbia | $1.63 | |
| 16 | April 22, 2007 | Fracture | $0.99 | Disturbia was #1 in North America. |
| 17 | April 29, 2007 | Fracture | $0.92 | Disturbia was #1 in North America. |
| 18 | May 6, 2007 | Spider-Man 3 | $11.69 | |
| 19 | May 13, 2007 | Spider-Man 3 | $5.15 | |
| 20 | May 20, 2007 | Shrek the Third | $9.80 | |
| 21 | May 27, 2007 | Pirates of the Caribbean: At World's End † | $9.75 | |
| 22 | June 3, 2007 | Pirates of the Caribbean: At World's End † | $4.40 | |
| 23 | June 10, 2007 | Ocean's Thirteen | $2.84 | |
| 24 | June 17, 2007 | Fantastic Four: Rise of the Silver Surfer | $3.10 | |
| 25 | June 24, 2007 | Evan Almighty | $1.51 | |
| 26 | July 1, 2007 | Live Free or Die Hard | $2.43 | Ratatouille was #1 in North America. |
| 27 | July 8, 2007 | Transformers | $5.75 | |
| 28 | July 15, 2007 | Harry Potter and the Order of the Phoenix | $7.18 | |
| 29 | July 22, 2007 | Harry Potter and the Order of the Phoenix | $3.36 | I Now Pronounce You Chuck and Larry was #1 in North America. |
| 30 | July 29, 2007 | The Simpsons Movie | $5.64 | |
| 31 | August 5, 2007 | The Bourne Ultimatum | $4.88 | |
| 32 | August 12, 2007 | The Bourne Ultimatum | $2.68 | Rush Hour 3 was #1 in North America |
| 33 | August 19, 2007 | Superbad | $2.48 | |
| 34 | August 26, 2007 | Mr. Bean's Holiday | $1.87 | Superbad was #1 in North America. |
| 35 | September 2, 2007 | Superbad | $1.49 | Halloween was #1 in North America. |
| 36 | September 9, 2007 | Superbad | $0.96 | 3:10 to Yuma was #1 in North America. |
| 37 | September 16, 2007 | The Brave One | $0.82 | |
| 38 | September 23, 2007 | Resident Evil: Extinction | $1.86 | |
| 39 | September 30, 2007 | The Kingdom | $1.43 | The Game Plan was #1 in North America. |
| 40 | October 7, 2007 | The Heartbreak Kid | $1.11 | The Game Plan was #1 in North America. |
| 41 | October 14, 2007 | We Own the Night | $1.13 | Why Did I Get Married? was #1 in North America. |
| 42 | October 21, 2007 | 30 Days of Night | $1.23 | |
| 43 | October 28, 2007 | Saw IV | $1.81 | |
| 44 | November 4, 2007 | American Gangster | $3.11 | |
| 45 | November 11, 2007 | Bee Movie | $2.28 | Bee Movie reached #1 in its 2nd weekend of release. |
| 46 | November 18, 2007 | Beowulf | $2.13 | |
| 47 | November 25, 2007 | Enchanted | $2.07 | |
| 48 | December 2, 2007 | Enchanted | $1.44 | |
| 49 | December 9, 2007 | The Golden Compass | $2.67 | |
| 50 | December 16, 2007 | I Am Legend | $4.10 | |
| 51 | December 23, 2007 | I Am Legend | $2.54 | National Treasure: Book of Secrets was #1 in North America. |
| 52 | December 30, 2007 | I Am Legend | $2.17 | National Treasure: Book of Secrets was #1 in North America. |

== Highest-grossing films in Canada ==
| Rank | Title | Studio | Total Gross (in millions) | Notes |
|---|---|---|---|---|
| 1 | Harry Potter and the Order of the Phoenix | Warner Bros. | $31.27 | |
| 2 | Spider-Man 3 | Sony | $30.57 | |
| 3 | Transformers | Paramount/DreamWorks | $27.24 | |
| 4 | Pirates of the Caribbean: At World's End | Disney | $26.77 | |
| 5 | Shrek the Third | Paramount/DreamWorks | $26.41 | |
| 6 | The Bourne Ultimatum | Universal | $22.26 | |
| 7 | 300 | Warner Bros. | $22.17 | |
| 8 | I Am Legend | Warner Bros. | $19.51 | |
| 9 | The Simpsons Movie | Fox | $18.93 | |
| 10 | National Treasure: Book of Secrets | Disney | $15.01 | |
| 11 | Juno | Fox Searchlight | $14.21 | |
| 12 | Ratatouille | Disney/Pixar | $13.66 | |
| 13 | Superbad | Sony | $13.43 | |
| 14 | Knocked Up | Universal | $13.28 | |
| 15 | Wild Hogs | Disney | $12.81 | |
| 16 | Alvin and the Chipmunks | Fox | $12.51 | |
| 17 | American Gangster | Universal | $11.42 | |
| 18 | Hairspray | New Line | $10.99 | |
| 19 | Live Free or Die Hard | Fox | $10.86 | |
| 20 | Blades of Glory | Paramount/DreamWorks | $10.46 | |
| 21 | Bee Movie | Paramount/DreamWorks | $10.23 | |
| 22 | Rush Hour 3 | New Line | $9.49 | |
| 23 | Ocean's Thirteen | Warner Bros. | $9.22 | |
| 24 | Ghost Rider | Sony | $9.11 | |
| 25 | I Now Pronounce You Chuck and Larry | Universal | $8.70 | |

== See also ==
- List of Canadian films
