= Wild Hogs =

2007 film by Walt Becker

- Theatrical release poster
- Directed by: Walt Becker
- Written by: Brad Copeland
- Produced by: Mike Tollin; Brian Robbins; Todd Lieberman
- Starring: Tim Allen; John Travolta; Martin Lawrence; William H. Macy; Marisa Tomei; Jill Hennessy; Ray Liotta
- Cinematography: Robbie Greenberg
- Edited by: Christopher Greenbury; Stuart Pappé
- Music by: Teddy Castellucci
- Production companies: Touchstone Pictures; Tollin/Robbins Productions
- Distributed by: Buena Vista Pictures Distribution
- Release date: March 2, 2007
- Running time: 100 minutes
- Country: United States
- Language: English
- Budget: $60 million
- Box office: $253.6 million

Wild Hogs is a 2007 American biker road comedy film written by Brad Copeland, directed by Walt Becker and starring Tim Allen, John Travolta, Martin Lawrence and William H. Macy. It was released nationwide in the United States and Canada on March 2, 2007. The film received negative reviews, but was a box office success that grossed over $253 million against a budget of $60 million.

It was the last Touchstone Pictures film to be distributed by Buena Vista Pictures Distribution, after Disney retired the Buena Vista moniker across their company's divisions in the same year. The theatrical distribution label became Walt Disney Studios Motion Pictures.

== Plot ==
Woody Stevens, Doug Madsen, Bobby Davis, and Dudley Frank are disillusioned middle-aged everymen in a Cincinnati suburb. Woody is a wealthy lawyer married to a supermodel; Doug is a dentist with trouble bonding with his son Billy; Bobby is a henpecked plumber disrespected by his wife Karen and two daughters Haley & Claire; and Dudley is a socially awkward, single computer programmer. They escape their routine lives on weekends by riding in their motorcycle club, the Wild Hogs.

Woody's wife is divorcing him and rendering him bankrupt, so he convinces the other three to take a road trip to California. After several encounters on the trip they run into a roadhouse bar where they encounter the Del Fuegos, an outlaw biker gang headed by Jack Blade. Feeling disrespected by the Wild Hogs, Jack steals Dudley's bike, so he has to travel in a sidecar.

Woody suggests they return to the bar to get Dudley's bike back but no one joins him. He secretly retrieves the bike and cuts the fuel lines of the gang's bikes, falsely telling the others he threatened a lawsuit. The Del Fuegos attempt to pursue the Wild Hogs to no avail. Jack's dropped cigarette ignites the leaking fuel and burns the bar down.

The Wild Hogs run out of gas, so push their bikes to Madrid, New Mexico, where they are initially mistaken for the Del Fuegos. They learn that the Del Fuegos have been terrorizing the town, and Dudley falls in love with the diner owner Maggie.

Two Del Fuegos, however, spot them, reporting their location to Jack. He tells them not to harm the Wild Hogs until he gets there, leaving them unable to fight back when Bobby confronts the pair and scares them off. The Wild Hogs are hailed as heroes and celebrate well into the night.

The next day, the Wild Hogs' departure is interrupted by the arrival of the Del Fuegos. Jack threatens to wreck the town unless the Wild Hogs pay for their bar. Woody admits to the others what he did to get Dudley's bike back, as well as his real reason for the trip – his bankruptcy and divorce. Jack and the Del Fuegos take over Maggie's diner and threaten to burn it down but Dudley confronts them; he is held hostage.

After failing to rescue Dudley, the Wild Hogs then decide to fight four of the members (Jack, Red, Murdock, and "Tiny" (a member trained in martial arts); the Wild Hogs are badly beaten but refuse to give up. The townspeople band together against the gang.

Just as Jack threatens to take on the rest of the town, Damien Blade, Jack's father and the founder of the Del Fuegos, arrives and lectures Jack for his behavior. He also reveals that the bar (which he had built) was an insurance scam and says the Wild Hogs did him a favor by destroying it. Damien then tells the gang to ride the open road until they remember what riding is about.

Doug's and Bobby's wives arrive and Doug reconciles with Billy. Karen orders Bobby to return with her, but he convinces her to let him finish the ride. The Wild Hogs arrive in Southern California where everyone except Dudley crashes into a surfboard.

During the credits, it is revealed that the Wild Hogs called Extreme Makeover: Home Edition to give the Del Fuegos a new bar. The Del Fuegos react in joy while the Wild Hogs watch the event on television.

== Cast ==
- Tim Allen as Dr. Doug Madsen, Dentist
- John Travolta as Woody Stevens, Attorney
- Martin Lawrence as Bobby Davis
- William H. Macy as Dudley Frank
- Marisa Tomei as Maggie
- Jill Hennessy as Kelly Madsen, Doug's wife
- Ray Liotta as Jack Blade
- Stephen Tobolowsky as Sheriff Charley
- M. C. Gainey as Murdock
- Kevin Durand as Red
- Tichina Arnold as Karen Davis, Bobby's wife
- Dominic Janes as Billy Madsen, Doug & Kelly's son
- Drew Sidora as Haley Davis, Bobby & Karen's first daughter
- Cymfenee as Claire Davis, Bobby & Karen's second daughter
- John C. McGinley as Hawk
- Michael Hitchcock as Kent
- Jason Sklar as Deputy Earl Dooble
- Randy Sklar as Deputy Buck Dooble
- Peter Fonda as Damien Blade, Jack's father
- Kyle Gass as himself
- Ty Pennington as himself

== Motorcycles ==
Harley-Davidson provided the motorcycles for the making of this film.

- Screamin' Eagle Fatboy for Woody.
- Black Fatboy with a chrome front wheel for Doug.
- FXSTS Springer Softail for Bobby.
- XL1200C Sportster Custom for Dudley.

Many of the motorcycles used by the Del Fuego gang were customized choppers. The motorcycle used by Jack featured the logo for Orange County Choppers, run by Paul Teutul Sr. with design work by Paul Teutul Jr. Both Teutuls make cameo appearances in the film.

Tim Allen, an automotive collector, gave input to the design of his motorcycle. Of the bikes used in the film by the four main characters, his is the most customized.

== Production ==
Producer Brian Robbins believed casting was essential to the success of the film, and emphasized the importance of working with movie stars. Robbins praised Disney for trusting in four older, experienced, but more expensive actors, and said "A lot of studios today are afraid to take those chances of hiring. Disney wasn't afraid, and it paid off."

Although the story is set in Ohio and other locations, with the exception of the final scene in southern California, it was filmed in New Mexico. The opening scenes in Cincinnati were filmed in and around Albuquerque. The ending showdown scenes in Madrid, New Mexico, are that of the real town of Madrid, New Mexico, with many of its local townspeople used as extras in June 2006.

== Reception ==
=== Box office ===
Wild Hogs opened on March 2, 2007, the film grossed $39.7 million on its opening weekend, ranking #1 in box office sales and nearly tripling the debut of fellow opener Zodiac. The film performed well throughout its entire run, falling just 30.5% in its second weekend and ultimately grossing $168.2 million domestically and $253.6 million worldwide, becoming Travolta's first film since The General's Daughter in 1999 to gross over $100 million domestically.

=== Critical response ===
On Rotten Tomatoes, Wild Hogs has an approval rating of 14% based on 145 reviews with an average rating of 4.00/10. The site's critical consensus reads, "Wild Hogs is a dreadful combination of fish-out-of-water jokes, slapstick, and lazy stereotypes." On Metacritic, the film has a score of 27 out of 100 based on reviews from 29 critics, indicating "generally unfavorable reviews". Audiences polled by CinemaScore gave the film an average grade of "B+" on an A+ to F scale.

Ty Burr of The Boston Globe compared the film's merits to its titular motorcycles, believing it to be "a bumptious weekend ride... the engine could use tuning and the plugs are shot, but it gets you most of the way there." Although writing a negative review, Burr offered praise for the film's final act, believing it "takes a satisfying turn" and that, with the exception of Allen, each of the film's primary cast members "earned his designated chuckle." He also favorably compared the film to RV, another comedy film focusing on a road trip.

Peter Travers of Rolling Stone gave it two out of four stars and wrote: "Jokes dying on the lips of these easy riders are hard to stomach." Dennis Harvey of Variety wrote: "Uninspired script and broad slapstick yuks won't earn this any plaudits, but slick, safe package should do OK with North American mall [audiences]".

=== Accolades ===
The film was nominated for a People's Choice Award in the category "Favorite Movie Comedy".

=== Lawsuit ===
In March 2007, the Hells Angels filed suit against Walt Disney Motion Pictures Group alleging that the film used both the name and distinctive logo of the Hells Angels Motorcycle Club without permission. That suit resulted in voluntary dismissal.

== Home media ==
Wild Hogs was released on DVD and Blu-ray Disc on August 14, 2007 at the retail price of $29.99 and $34.99 respectively. The DVD edition featured the following bonus content: the making-of, an alternate ending, deleted scenes, audio commentary with director Walt Becker and writer Brad Copeland, along with outtakes and easter eggs.

== Cancelled sequel ==
Disney announced that a sequel, Wild Hogs 2: Bachelor Ride, would be released in 2010, but by December 2009 plans had been cancelled. After Disney's next comedy starring John Travolta, Old Dogs (co-starring Robin Williams), was released on November 25, 2009 and was a critical failure, Disney cancelled both Wild Hogs 2: Bachelor Ride and Wedding Banned, a comedy that was to star Williams, Diane Keaton and Anna Faris.
