= Steel Beasts =

Steel Beasts is the name for a family of tank simulators created by eSim Games for Microsoft Windows.

Its subject is contemporary combined arms tactics (with emphasis on modern armoured fighting vehicles) at a company scale. As a consumer game, it is a genre mix of strategy game, action game, simulation game, and wargame of fairly complex gameplay.

Steel Beasts (more colloquially known as SB to its fans) is distinguished from other simulators by a faithful reproduction of tactical maneuvers and Fire Control Systems as well as various other military facets than when compared to other simulators. The sound samples are mostly authentic, having been recorded from some of the actual armored fighting vehicles depicted in the sim.

Customized versions of Steel Beasts have been adopted by the armies of Australia, Austria, Canada, Chile, Denmark, Greece, Finland, the Netherlands, Norway, Spain, Sweden and USA for training purposes.

== Steel Beasts ==
Steel Beasts
- Developer: eSim Games
- Publisher: Shrapnel Games
- Series: Steel Beasts
- Platform: Microsoft Windows XP/2000/ME/98/95
- Release: August 25th, 2000
- Genre: Tank simulator

Steel Beasts is a modern tank simulator that focuses on the US M1A1 Abrams and German Leopard 2A4 main battle tanks. Both machines are fully drivable and are reproduced in painstaking detail in the game. In addition to these tanks, Steel Beasts models a number of modern armored vehicles such as the Russian T-80, the German Marder, and a variety of armored personnel carriers. Steel Beasts allows the player assume the tank commander's or gunner's seat in the Abrams and Leopard 2, as well as move to an external camera view in each vehicle. The variety of units in the game (including infantry) allows for a wide range of different scenarios.

The game was announced in March 2000, and was published exclusively through Shrapnel's website. Strategy First published a physical version of the game in 2001.

=== Critical reception ===
On the review aggregator GameRankings, the game had an average score of 87% based on 21 reviews. On Metacritic, the game had an average score of 86 out of 100, based on 13 reviews.

Critical response to the original Steel Beasts was quite consistent. Reviewers were initially put off by the substandard 640×480 graphics, then highly impressed by the gameplay, immersion and the intelligent-seeming behaviors exhibited by the computerized units.

Bruce Geryk of GameSpot gave the game a rating of 8.8 out 10.

PC Gamer US named Steel Beasts the best simulation game of 2000. The editors of Computer Gaming World nominated Steel Beasts as the best simulation game of 2000, although it lost to Comanche vs. Hokum. The editors of Computer Games Magazine also nominated Steel Beasts for their 2000 "Simulation of the Year" award. The Wargamer named it as the best war simulation game of 2000.

== Steel Beasts Pro PE ==
Steel Beasts Pro PE
- Developer: eSim Games
- Series: Steel Beasts
- Platform: Microsoft Windows
- Release: March 2006
- Genre: Tank simulator
- Modes: Single-player, multiplayer

Steel Beasts Pro Personal Edition, abbreviated SB Pro PE, is the commercial version of the tank simulator Steel Beasts Pro made by eSim Games for Microsoft Windows. It is an armored fighting vehicle-focused game of combined arms combat tactics at the battalion level and below. Players can directly control a vehicle, and also control multiple vehicles through a map view. Many vehicles, such as the classic M1A1 Abrams and Leopard 2A4, are fully crew-able, have realistic representations of their actual fire control systems and allow players to aim and fire their weapons. More recently, vehicles such as the Leopard 2A6 and M1A2 SEP have been added and are fully crew-able. Other armored fighting vehicles, such as the M2/M3 Bradley, CV90 and Marder are also fully crewable. Crewable vehicles are usually added as a result of military contracts.

As a tactical simulation, artillery is modelled in the sim and the player can call in various types of artillery, from conventional smoke and high-explosive rounds, to DPICM and the FASCAM minefield system.

The interior view of the Leopard 2A4 gunners position in-game.

SB also includes a scenario editor, which allows for programming of random or condition-based behavior in the computer-controlled units. Well-designed SB scenarios therefore have a high degree of replayability. In addition to the scenario editor, SB also contains a map editor for creating custom maps depicting different terrain types. In the Fall of 2011, eSim Games announced that they were using Xaitment's AI software for pathfinding, movement and behavior modeling.

=== Reception ===
Pelit magazine rated the game 85/100.
