= Harley-Davidson: Race Across America =

1999 video game

- Developers: Canopy Games, G2M Games (PC); Running Dog, Xantera (GBC)
- Publisher: WizardWorks
- Platforms: Windows; Game Boy Color
- Release: Windows: NA: September 21, 1999; Game Boy Color: NA: December 21, 2000
- Genre: Racing
- Modes: Single-player, multiplayer

Harley-Davidson: Race Across America is a racing game developed by Canopy Games and G2M Games, and published by WizardWorks in 1999. The game centers on racing Harley-Davidson motorcycles across different locales in the United States, with the ultimate goal being to reach the Sturgis Motorcycle Rally.

A version of the game was developed for the Game Boy Color by Running Dog and Xantera, released in 2000. Race Across America was later followed by Harley-Davidson: Wheels of Freedom, released in 2000.

== Gameplay ==
=== Windows ===
Gameplay screenshot showing the player's motorcycle, a Harley-Davidson Super Glide, approaching a gas station.

In Race Across America, players take part in a series of point-to-point races on Harley-Davidson motorcycles across real-world locations in the United States.

The game offers two single-player modes: Practice Race, where players can select a single course and a bike to race on, and Tour Game, the game's main mode in which players participate in a tour leading to the Sturgis Motorcycle Rally in South Dakota. A number of pre-determined routes can be chosen by the player in Tour Game, all of which take place in numerous American locales, namely Arizona, California, Colorado, Utah and Harley-Davidson's home state of Wisconsin. Various landmarks are also featured in the game, namely the Corn Palace in Mitchell, South Dakota and the Dinosaur National Monument in Utah, among others.

Race Across America employs a number of motorcycles from the company—from the Twin Cam 88-powered Dyna Low Rider to the 1956 KHK; the latter can be unlocked by finishing the game's Tour mode. Each motorcycle is distinguished by its handling, performance and fuel economy characteristics, and can be altered with performance upgrades at the shop using money acquired from winning races. The player is given a limited amount of fuel which can be replenished at "67" gas stations scattered across each course.

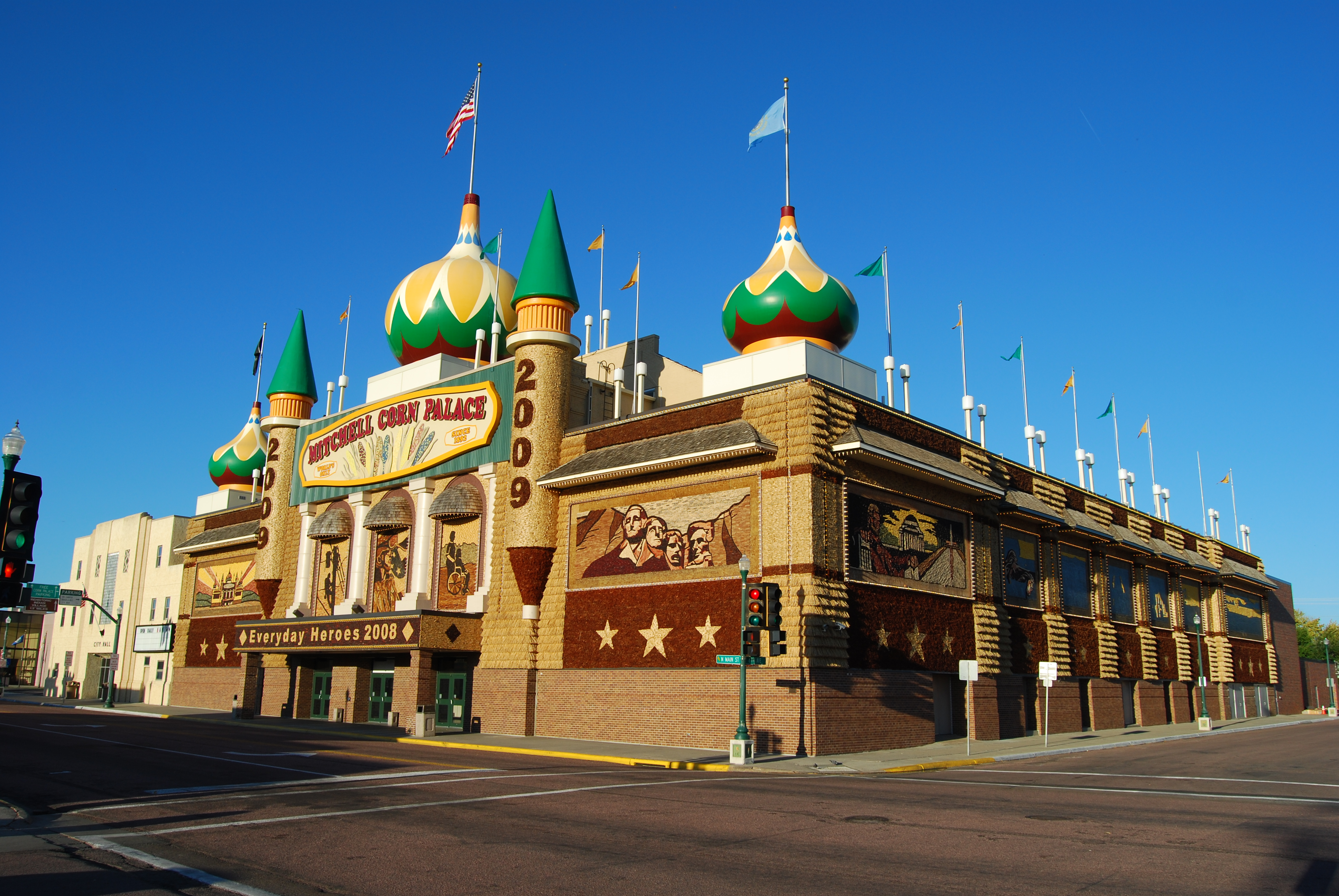
A number of real-world landmarks are also featured in the game, particularly the Corn Palace in Mitchell, South Dakota.

In addition to the single-player mode, Race Across America also features a multiplayer mode on the PC version, allowing up to four players to engage in races in recreations of the single-player courses, with support for local-area network, modem, serial and Internet play.

=== Game Boy Color ===
The Game Boy Color version was developed by Running Dog and Xantera, and published by Infogrames. The game is presented similarly to the earlier Mindscape game Harley-Davidson: The Road to Sturgis in terms of graphics due to the Game Boy Color's hardware limitations, and only features four courses and four motorcycles compared to the six in the original Windows release.

== Reception ==
Reception

Aggregate score
Aggregator	Score
GameRankings	37%

Review scores
Publication	Score
AllGame	1.5/5
CNET Gamecenter	3/10
Computer Games Strategy Plus	0.5/5
GameFan	51%
GameSpot	5.2/10
IGN	4.8/10
Jeuxvideo.com	5/20
Nintendo Power	(GBC) 5.4/10
PC Accelerator	4/10
PC Gamer (UK)	14%

The PC version received unfavorable reviews according to the review aggregation website GameRankings. Chris Gregson of GameSpot said, "Its uninspired arcade-style biking action doesn't come close to doing justice to the big-name license." Vincent Lopez of IGN gave the same PC version a similarly negative review, criticizing the lackluster gameplay, along with the complex multiplayer and graphics configuration options menus which he viewed as being too complicated for its target audience.
