= Harley-Davidson Milwaukee-Eight engine =

Harley-Davidson Milwaukee-Eight Engine
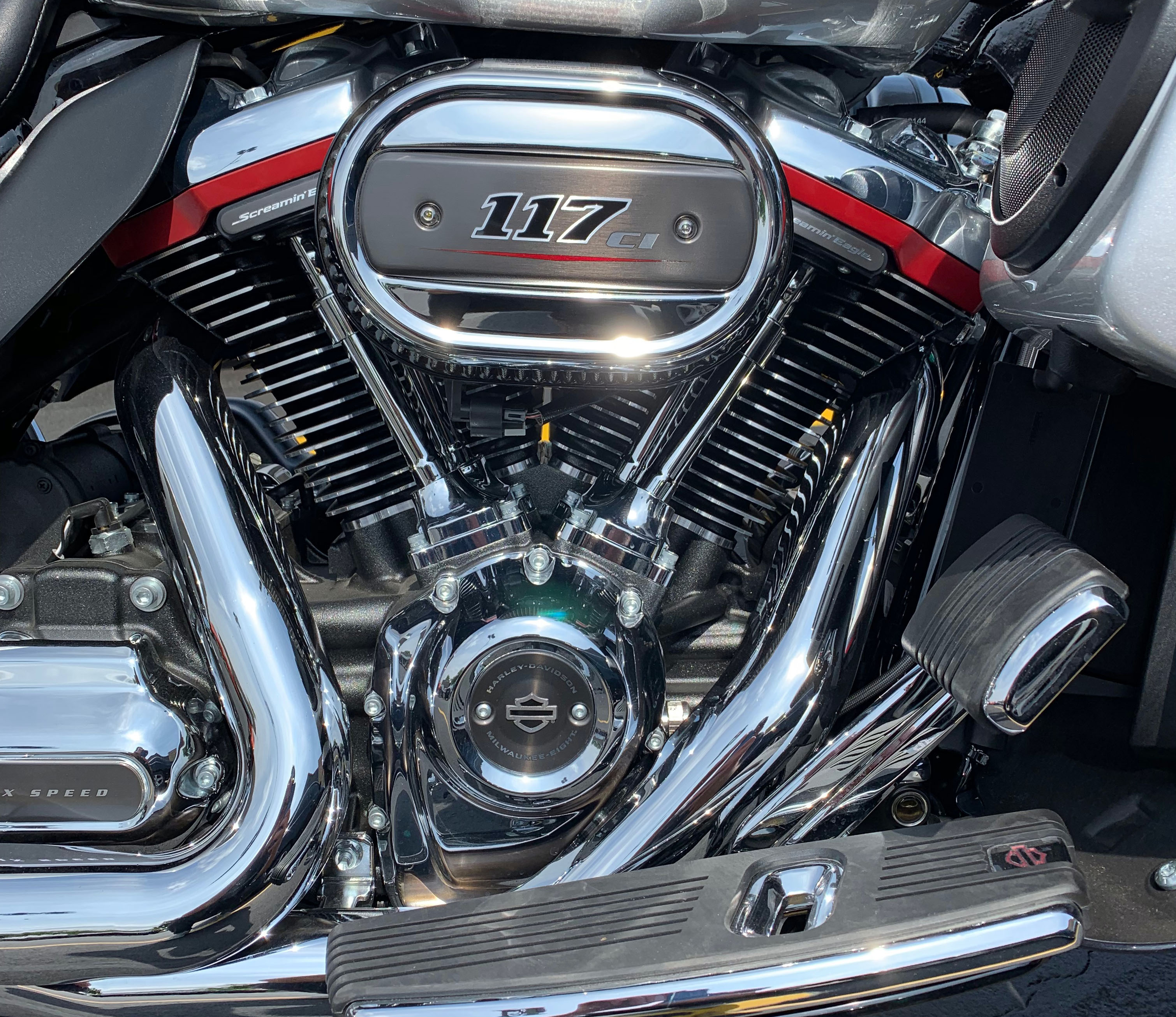
- The Milwaukee-Eight engine 117 (2019)
- Manufacturer: Harley-Davidson
- Parent company: Harley-Davidson
- Production: Since 2017
- Predecessor: Twin Cam
- Class: V-Twin
- Power: 81hp 107ci, 86hp 114ci @rear wheel

The Harley-Davidson Milwaukee-Eight engine is the ninth generation of "big twin" engines developed by the company. Introduced in 2016, it is Harley's fourth all-new Big Twin engine family. These engines differ from the traditional Harley Big Twin engines in that there are four valves per cylinder, totaling eight valves, hence the name. It also marked a return to the single-camshaft configuration as used on previous Harley Big Twin engines from 1936 to 1999. In addition, the engines all have internal counterbalancers.

== 107, 114, 117, and 121 engines ==
All engines have eight valves in two cylinders in the traditional Harley-Davidson Radial V-twin configuration at 45°, are combination of air-cooled and oil-cooled, and activate valves with push-rods. The 107 cu in (1,750 cc) model with a claimed 108–112 lb⋅ft (146–152 N⋅m) is standard on all models, with the 114 cu in (1,870 cc) version making a claimed 119 lb⋅ft (161 N⋅m) remaining as an option on some softails and all touring and trike models, and the 117 cu in (1,920 cc) is standard on CVO models with a claimed 124 lb⋅ft (168 N⋅m) and rear wheel power of 93.75 hp (69.91 kW) @ 4,870 rpm and 112.51 lb⋅ft (152.54 N⋅m) @ 3,400 rpm. For model year 2022, the 117 cu in version became standard on Breakout and Low Rider S/ST Softail models and on the "ST" variants of the Touring models. In 2023, the 121 cu in (1,980 cc) version equipped with variable-valve timing debuted on the CVO models.

== Differences from the predecessor (Twin Cam) ==
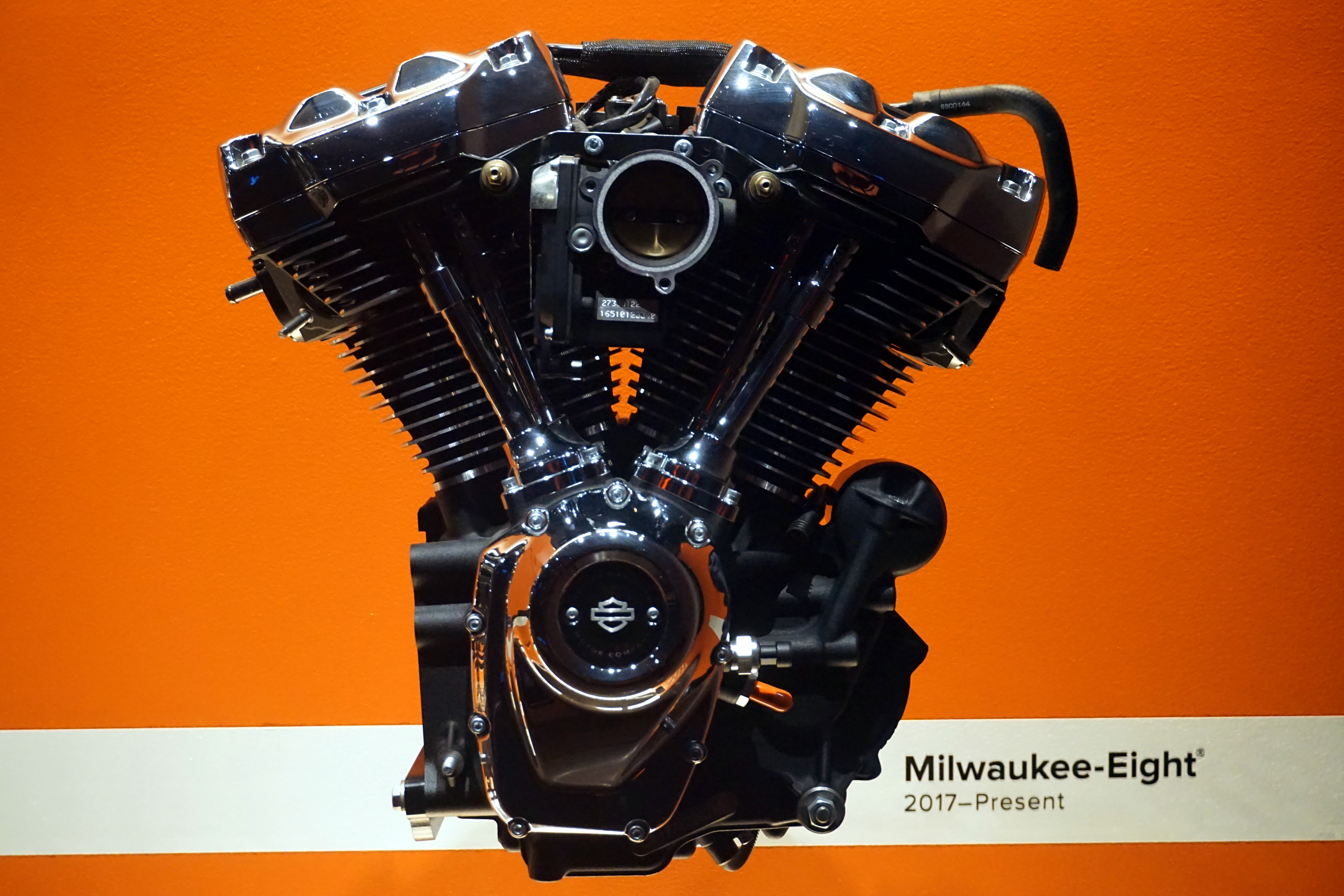
Harley-Davidson Milwaukee-Eight engine at the Harley-Davidson Museum

In 2016, the Milwaukee-Eight engines became available on Touring and Trike models of the 2017 model year. The Softail models started using the Milwaukee-Eight the following year. The most significant change from the Twin Cam are the two extra valves per cylinder head which produce 10 percent more torque and a return to a single camshaft. The exhaust and intake flow capacity is increased by 50 percent over the Twin Cam models. Although weighing the same as its predecessor, both models of the Milwaukee-Eight increase in acceleration by 10% (0-60 for the 107 vs the 103) and 8% (0-60 for the 114 vs. the 110). Fuel economy is also increased, with percentages varying for engine and model.

== Improvements ==
Harley conducted interviews in seven cities; over 1,000 people were asked to outline what they would like to see in the next line of touring bikes. These interviews resulted in the new Milwaukee-Eight engine. The biggest improvements people wanted to see were more power, less heat, and less vibration. Harley was able to increase the power while also keeping the range and consumption similar and in some cases making it even better. To deal with the heat issue, Harley reduced the exhaust gas temperature by 100°F (55.6 C) by introducing a better water cooling solution, and also relocated the hot catalytic converters further from the cockpit, allowing for a more comfortable ride. Finally, Harley looked at the vibration issues and decided to reduce the vibrations by 75%, to try to effect a balance between the expectations of hardcore fans and new Harley owners.

== Reception ==
Cycle World, like many other motorcycle magazines, was given the opportunity to test ride and review the Milwaukee-Eight engine. The reviews have been positive, and report a better ride quality, while still keeping the Harley feel. Cycle World's reviewer reported a noticeable reduction in the heat output from the engine, enabling the reviewer to ride more comfortably. The review concludes that the changes make this engine an improvement over its predecessor.
