= Havok (company) =

Irish software company

Telekinesys Research Limited
- Trade name: Havok Group
- Company type: Subsidiary
- Industry: Software
- Founded: 9 July 1998; 27 years ago
- Founders: Hugh Reynolds; Steven Collins
- Headquarters: Dublin, Ireland
- Number of locations: 4 (2024)
- Area served: Worldwide
- Key people: David Coghlan (general manager); Andrew Bond (VP of technology); Dave Gargan (VP of engineering)
- Products: Havok; Vision
- Owner: Intel (2007–2015); Microsoft (2015–present)
- Parent: Microsoft Research (2015–present)
- Subsidiaries: Trinigy (defunct)
- Website: havok.com

Telekinesys Research Limited (TR), doing business as Havok Group, is an Irish software company founded on 9 July 1998 by Hugh Reynolds and Steven Collins, based in Dublin, Ireland, and owned by Microsoft's Ireland Research subsidiary. They have partnerships with Activision, Electronic Arts, Nintendo, Xbox Game Studios, Sony Interactive Entertainment, Bethesda Softworks and Ubisoft.

Its cross-platform technology is available for PlayStation 2, PlayStation 3, PlayStation 4, PlayStation 5, PlayStation Portable, Xbox, Xbox 360, Xbox One, Xbox Series X and Series S, Wii, Wii U, GameCube, Nintendo Switch, MacOS, IOS and PCs. Havok's technology has been used in more than 150 game titles, including World of Tanks, Half-Life 2, Halo 2, Dark Souls, The Elder Scrolls IV: Oblivion, Age of Empires III, Super Smash Bros. Brawl, Starfield (video game), The Legend of Zelda: Tears of the Kingdom, the Assassin's Creed series, the Call of Duty series, and Final Fantasy XVI . Havok products have also been used to drive special effects in movies such as Poseidon, The Matrix, Troy, Kingdom of Heaven and Charlie and the Chocolate Factory. Havok provides the dynamics driving for Autodesk 3ds Max.

Intel announced the acquisition of Havok in a press release on 14 September 2007. On 2 October 2015, Intel sold Havok to Microsoft for an undisclosed amount.

== History and awards ==
=== History ===
Havok was founded in 1998 by Hugh Reynolds and Steven Collins of the computer science department in Trinity College, Dublin. Research and development is carried out in offices in Dublin, San Francisco and Tokyo.

=== Technology ===
- Havok (software)
- Vision (game engine)

=== Awards ===
- US National Academy of Television, Arts & Sciences Award, 2008 - (Technical Emmy)
- Red Herring 100 - 2006 Winner
- Best Choice of Computex - 2006 Winner
- OnHollywood - 2006 Winner
- Develop Industry Excellence Awards - 2006 Nominee - Best Tools Provider, 2005 Winner - Best Tools Provider, 2004 Nominee - Best Tools Provider
- Game Developer Frontline Award - 2006 Finalist - Middleware, 2003 Winner - Best Game Component, 2002 Winner - Best Game Component
- FileFront - "Most Advanced Technology" of 2004
- Computer Graphics World - CGW 2003 Innovation Award

== See also ==
- Havok (software)
