= Trinigy =

Independent technology company

- Company type: Subsidiary of Havok
- Industry: Game engine, Middleware
- Founded: Eningen, Germany
- Defunct: August 2011
- Fate: Merged into Havok
- Headquarters: Eningen, BW, Germany; Austin, Texas, USA; Seoul, South Korea
- Key people: Dag Frommhold, Manag. Director; Felix Roeken, GM; Florian Born, Technical Director; Fabian Roeken, Head of Support; Danie Conradie, CEO Trinigy, Inc.
- Products: Trinigy Vision Engine
- Parent: Havok

Trinigy was a German software development company.

In the second half of 2007, Trinigy expanded to the US and founded a fully owned subsidiary in Austin, TX. The US office is headed by Daniel J. Conradie, one of the original founders of Trinigy. In September 2010, the firm expanded to Asia and announced the set-up of an Asian office in Seoul, South Korea.

At the end of 2007, Trinigy's Vision Engine was nominated as an engine finalist for Game Developer Magazine's Frontline Award.

In June 2009 and June 2010, Trinigy's Vision Engine was nominated as an engine finalist for Develop Magazine's Industry Excellence Award.

On August 8, 2011, Havok (then a wholly owned subsidiary of Intel) announced that the company acquired Trinigy for an undisclosed amount. After closure of the sale, the team was integrated into Havok and the Trinigy Vision Engine was re-branded Havok Vision Engine.

== Vision Engine ==
The Vision Engine is a cross-platform 3D game engine middleware specifically targeted to the games industry. It currently supports the following platforms:

- Windows-PC
- Microsoft Xbox 360 (including Xbox Live Arcade)
- Sony PlayStation 3 (including PlayStation Network)
- Nintendo Wii (including WiiWare)
- Nintendo Wii U
- Web Browsers with Trinigy's new WebVision
- iOS
- Android
- Windows Phone 8
- Sony's PlayStation Vita (NGP)

Vision Engine full licenses typically come with full source code, updates and support to its licensees so developers have the possibility to customize the engine and its tools, exporters, and middleware bindings for their specific needs. The Vision SDK also provides comprehensive documentation, samples and video tutorials. According to Trinigy, the firm offers licensing models for both full-price A to AAA titles and Value Games as well as online-distributed XBLA / PSN / WiiWare productions.
