= Harley-Davidson: The Road to Sturgis =

1989 video game

- Developer: Incredible Technologies
- Publisher: Mindscape
- Platforms: Amiga, Atari ST, MS-DOS
- Release: 1989
- Genre: Racing

Harley-Davidson: The Road to Sturgis is a racing video game developed by Incredible Technologies and published in 1989 by Mindscape. It is based on the Harley-Davidson brand of motorcycles.

== Gameplay ==
The goal of the game is to get to the annual motorcycle rally in Sturgis in ten days. To get there players must ride on the highway, avoiding obstacles and stopping at pit stops.

== Reception ==
The game received mixed reviews after its release, some gamers citing the graphics as better than average, and others disappointed in how quickly the game became "tedious" and "repetitive" and could be beaten.
