= Steven Collins =

Irish computer scientist

- Education: Trinity College Dublin
- Known for: Havok physics engine; Kore Virtual Machine
- Scientific career
- Fields: Computer graphics; Physics engines
- Workplaces: Trinity College Dublin; Havok; King Digital Entertainment
- Thesis: Wavefront tracking for global illumination solutions (1996)

Steven Collins is a computer scientist who co-founded video game physics engine developer Havok and Kore Virtual Machines, makers of a virtual machine for the Lua programming language which later became part of the Havok software suite. Formerly a professor of computer graphics in the Department of Computer Science in Trinity College, Dublin, he co-managed the Graphics Vision and Visualisation Group Research Group.

== Early life ==
Born in Dundalk, County Louth, his exposure to programming began with the Commodore 64. He designed and programmed Herobotix, published by Hewson Consultants in 1987, and ported the arcade video game Badlands to the C64. He wrote about graphics techniques of the 8-bit home computer era for ACM SIGGRAPH's Computer Graphics Quarterly in 1998.

== Career ==
Collins and Hugh Reynolds co-founded Havok in 1998 in Dublin, a company which provides physics simulation software for video games and films. The company was sold to Intel in September 2007 for €76M. Both Collins and Reynolds received the 2007 "Trinity College Dublin Innovation Award" for Havok.

In 2007, Collins started the MSc in Interactive Entertainment Technology course in Trinity College Dublin, where he acts as course director and lectures in real-time rendering. He is quoted as saying that the course was started in order to educate the "future captains of industry" in reference to the games industry.

In March 2008, Collins and Reynolds founded "Kore Virtual Machines", a company which designed virtual machines for Lua, a programming language often used in video games. In October 2010, Kore was purchased by Havok and integrated into their software suite as Havok Script.

Collins is currently Chief Technology Officer of King Digital Entertainment, a leading mobile game publisher.
