= Softail =

Type of motorcycle

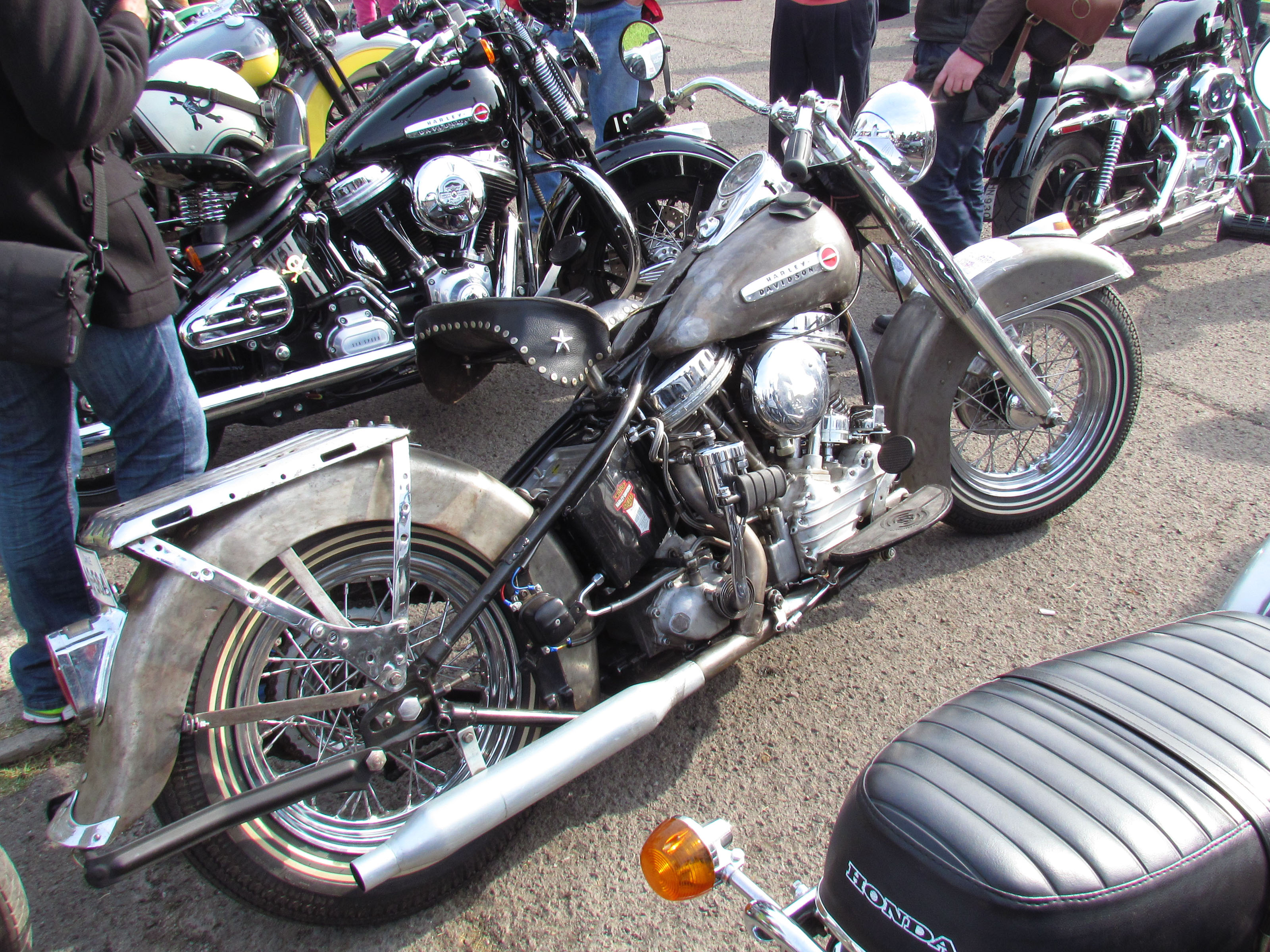
Three Harley-Davidsons, built about 50 years apart: unpainted 1950s Hydra Glide with clearly visible black hard-tail frame, next to a modern Softail Crossbones that copies the old frame design, the suspended seat, and even the oil tank in black. To the right a black Sportster with twin shocks

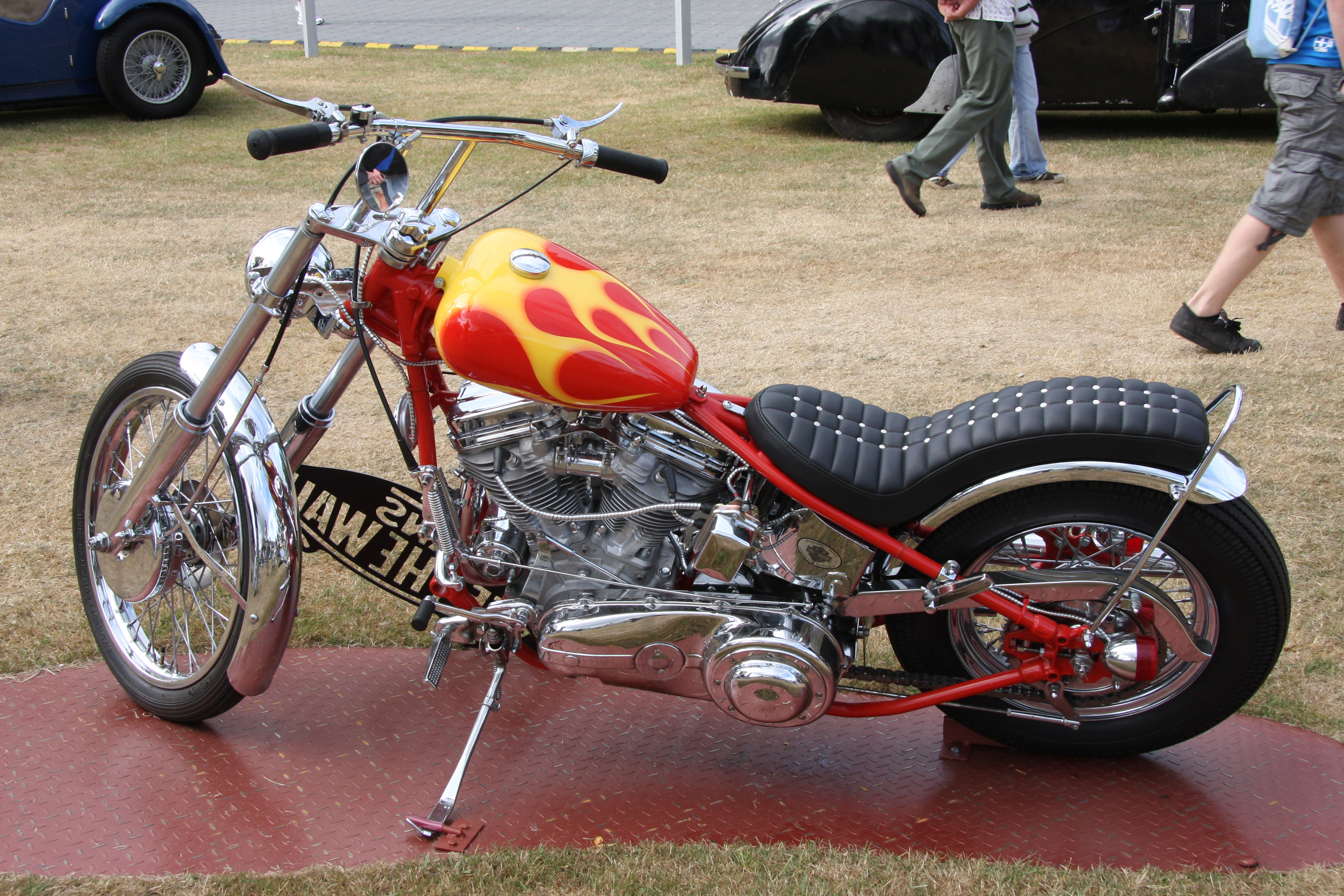
Harley Hydra Glide converted to a chopper as seen in the 1969 film Easy Rider, with 1950s hard-tail frame painted red

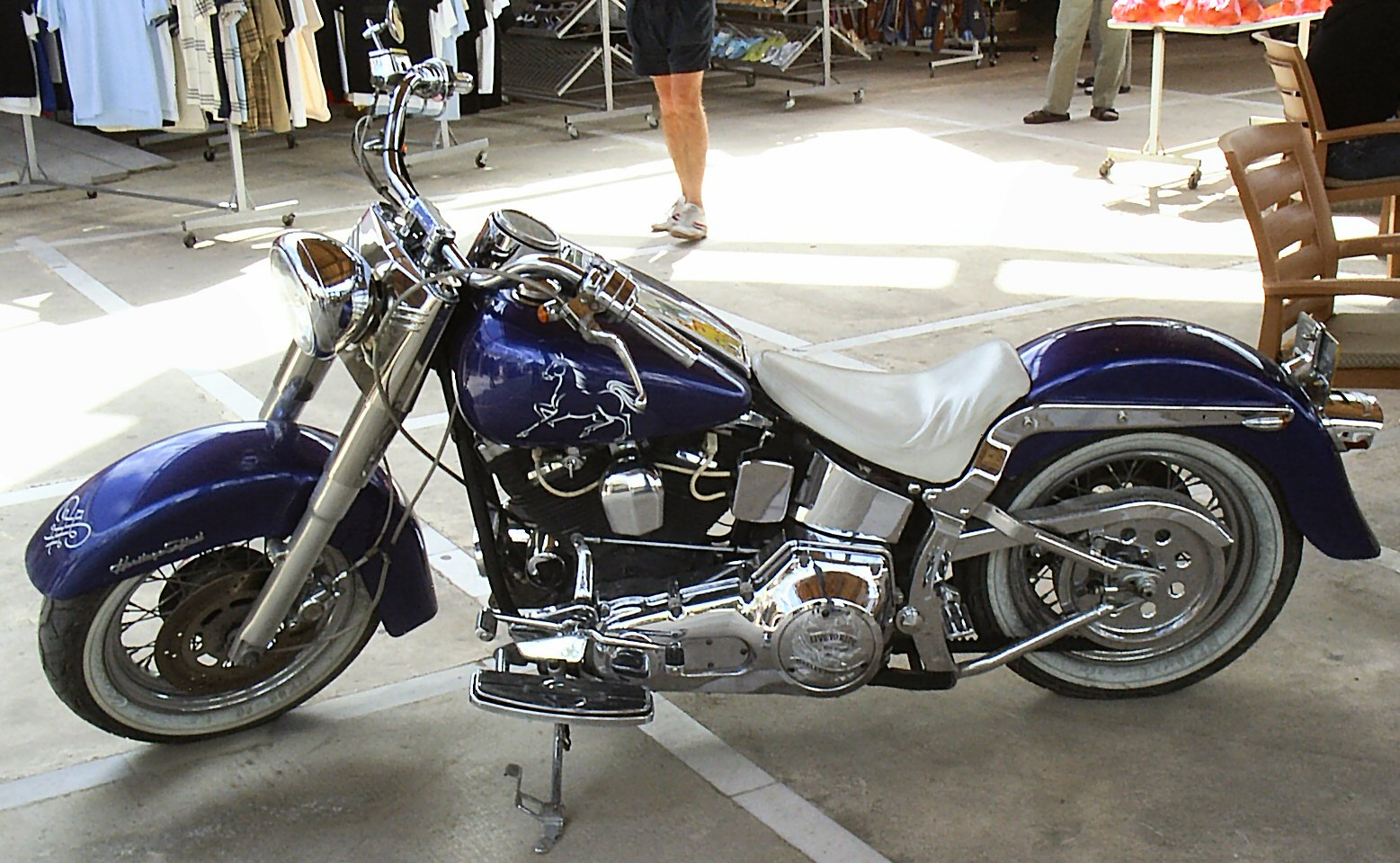
Harley-Davidson Heritage Softail with chrome swingarm shaped like a triangle

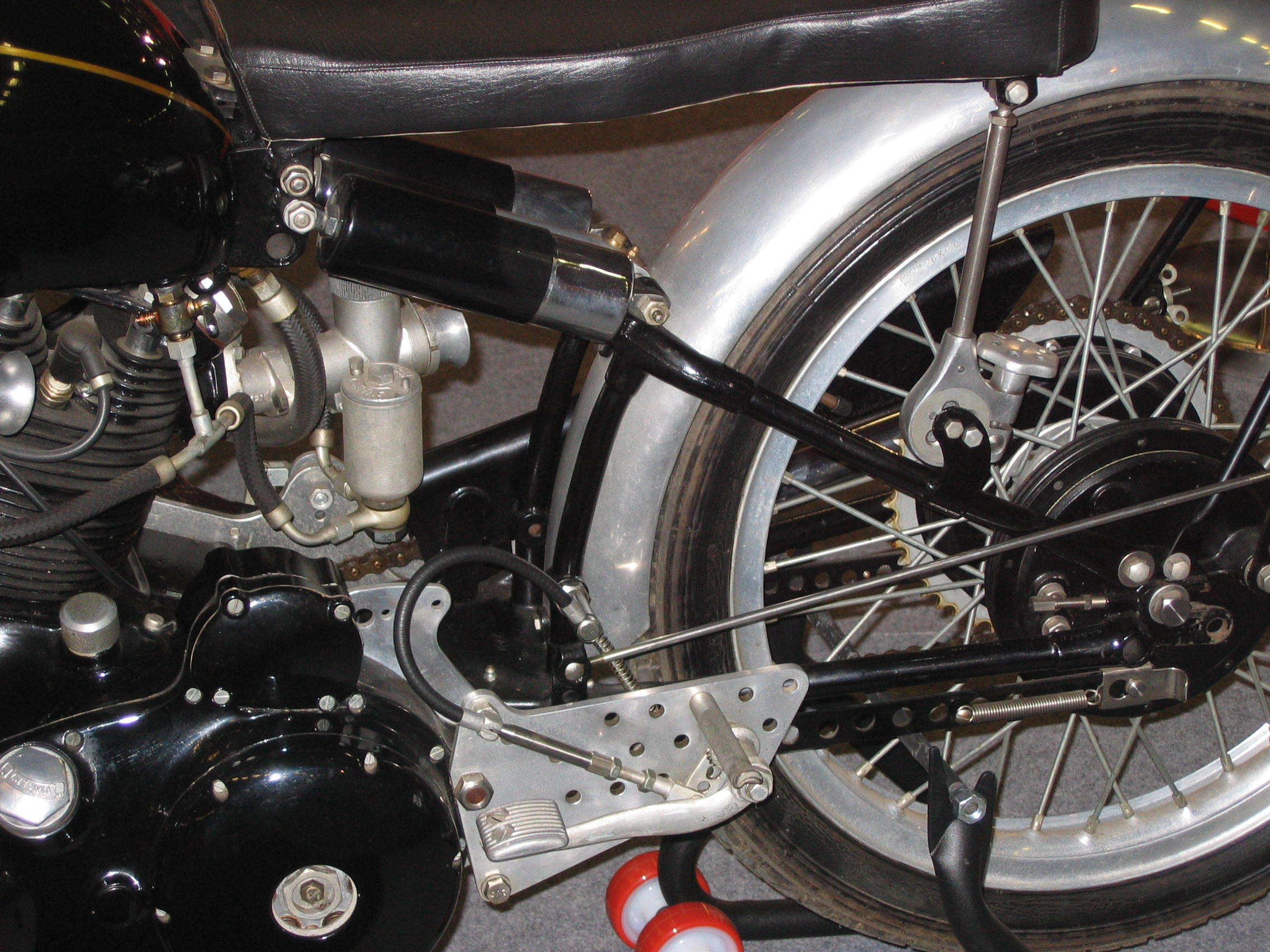
Rear suspension on a Vincent with shocks visible under the seat, introduced in late 1920s

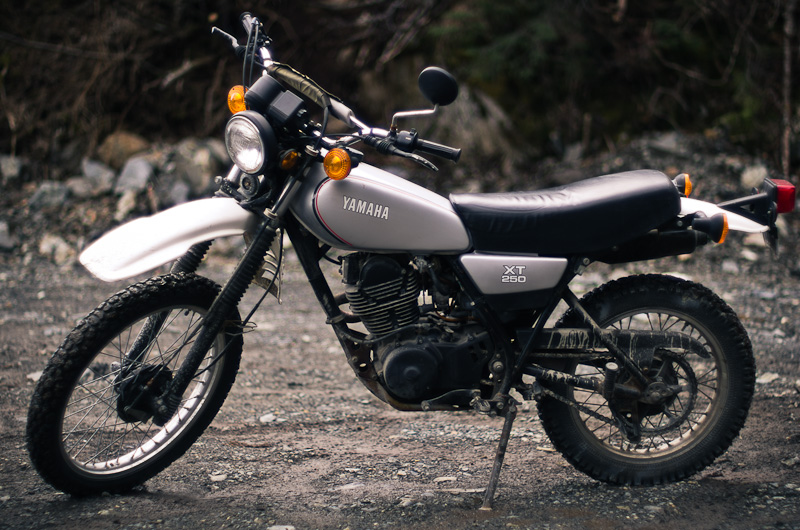
Yamaha XT250 introduced in 1979, cantilever swingarm with central shock hidden under the seat

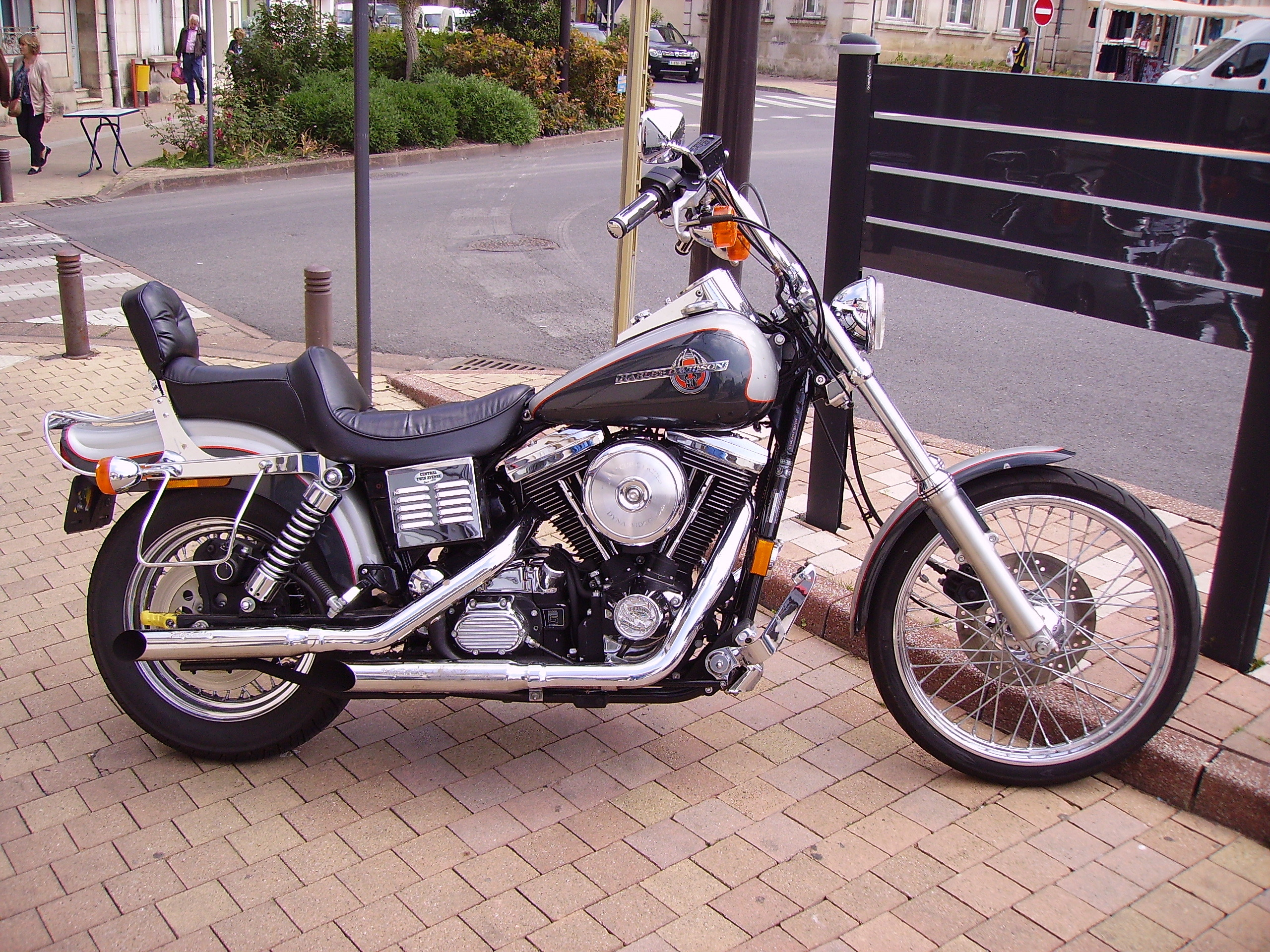
Harley-Davidson Wide Glide with regular swingarm, twin shocks and square battery box, as introduced in the 1957 Duo Glide

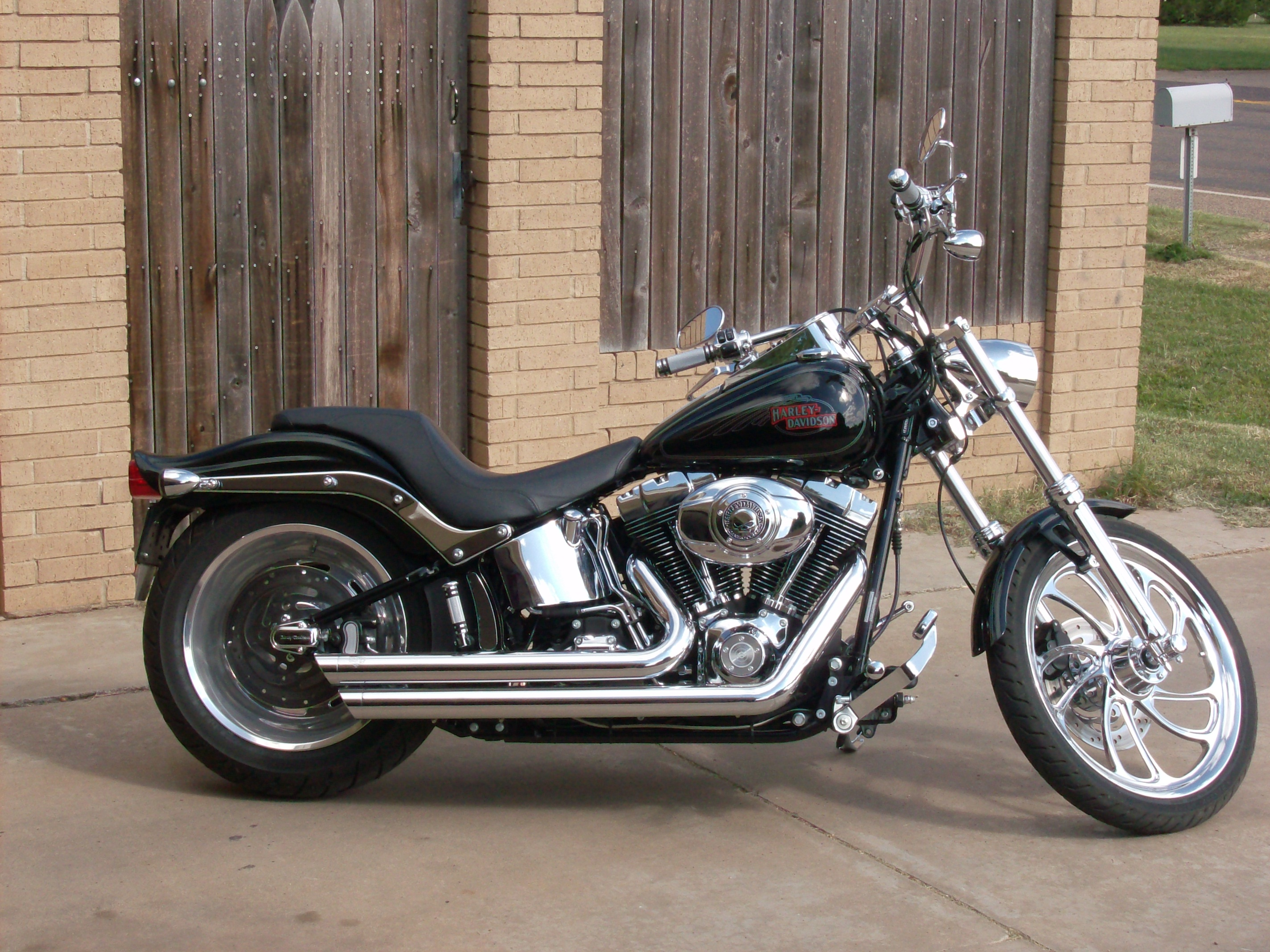
Harley-Davidson Softail with triangular swingarm, shocks under the gearbox, chrome horseshoe oil tank, as introduced in 1983

A softail (shortened form of soft tail) motorcycle intentionally looks like vintage motorcycles with a rigid hard-tail frame that has a triangle of steel tubes at the rear axle, as on a bicycle frame, but on a softail these tubes are actually a triangular swingarm, with the shock absorber(s) hidden, as opposed to clearly visible regular twin shocks on both sides of the rear wheel on standard bikes. Since the introduction of the Harley-Davidson FXST Softail in 1983 as a registered trademark of the Motor Company, softail has become a genericized trademark for other models of cruiser motorcycles with rear suspensions hidden for retro style reasons. This was done even though the rear wheel was often hidden behind bags or exhaust pipes.

== History ==
The first rear suspensions on motorcycles were introduced before World War I, and many companies offered fully suspended motorbikes before World War II, but most designs were either expensive, prone to wear and tear, or added more instability than comfort or better roadholding, especially when damping was insufficient. The models that remained hard tails offered suspended bicycle-like seats for a minimum of rider comfort. After World War II, imported British bikes with rear suspension and good handling became popular. Harley-Davidson replaced the Springer leading link fork in 1949 with a telescopic hydraulically dampened Hydra Glide front fork that offered more travel, a design that is still state-of-the-art today. After the all-new entry-level 1952 Harley-Davidson Model K adopted the by now standard rear swingarm with twin shock absorbers, the Big Twin FL continued to rely on the big suspended seat until the 1958 Duo Glide got twin shocks, too.

=== Hardtail cult following ===
In the 1950s and 1960s, customized motorcycles appeared, many of them based on old Harleys, like surplus US Army Harley-Davidson WLA, or other brands, and often with hard tail frames rather than suspended ones. While the earlier bobbers still used the suspended single seat, the 1960s choppers had a small seat cushion directly on the hard tail frame, giving the rider a position much lower and rearward than on stock Harleys, which at the time were mainly ridden by Police officers. This position was without doubt uncomfortable, but it looked cool and gave the rider a tough guy, outlaw image. Some other obsolete and risky features were still used for coolness, like the so-called suicide clutch that was operated by left foot, with the left hand working a jockey shift, or the kick starter, even after electric starters were available. Even the front brake was removed for a good clean look, like on the more famous of the Easy Rider Harleys, the "Captain America". As seen in the movie, these hard tails were not easy to ride on bad roads and could be painful if sat on over bumps such as railway crossings. Even after suspension was available for over 20 years, in the 1970s many riders preferred these old style tough guy frames, and even new hard tail frames were made by aftermarket companies.

In 1970, Harley only had the big twin full-dresser touring bike, the FLH Electra Glide, and the small XL Sportster. With the FX Super Glide, the Big Twin Harley-Davidson Shovelhead engine was offered without the extras of the E-Glide, and with the narrow front end of the Sportster, later offered as the FXRS Low Rider. By the end of the decade, the FXWG Wide Glide was kind of a factory chopper, with a wide telescopic fork like on the FLH, narrow 21 inch wheel, buckhorn handle bar, bobbed fender, a small sissy bar, and even flames paint job. It still had twin shocks, though, and many bikers wanted the clean look of the hard tail frame, with the frame forming a straight line from the steering head to the rear axle.

=== Introduction of the FXST Softail ===
Bill Davis, an avid Harley rider and engineer from St. Louis, Missouri, designed his softail in the mid-1970s. His first design, which he worked on in 1974 and 1975, had a cantilever swingarm like on vintage Vincent Motorcycles that pivoted at the bottom and sprung at the top with the springs and shock absorber hidden under the seat. Davis then built a prototype based on his 1972 Super Glide. He patented the design and arranged to meet Willie G. Davidson August 1976. Davidson was impressed, but made no commitments, and six months later, said Harley-Davidson was interested but would not use the design at that time.

In April 1980, Harley-Davidson started work on its own rear suspension design that would have the look of a hard-tail motorcycle. The job was given a low priority until later in the year it was transferred to Jim Haubert Engineering, a firm that Harley-Davidson contracted yearly to custom build motorcycles and prototypes. Haubert built a prototype using his own rear suspension design that closely followed the look of the earlier Harley rigid frames. This version was completed enough for review by Harley-Davidson in January 1981.

Davis continued to develop the design, switching the pivot and the springing points around so that the springs and shock absorber were under the frame and the pivot point was at the top of the triangular swingarm. This allowed the traditional horse shoe shaped Harley-Davidson oil tank to be placed under the seat. Davis attempted to produce the new design independently as the Road Worx Sub-Shock, but the partnership he had put together for this purpose collapsed. Harley-Davidson executive Jeffrey Bleustein contacted Davis shortly afterward and began negotiations to buy Davis's design. Davis sold his patents, prototype, and tooling to Harley-Davidson in January 1982.

After further testing and development, Davis's design was introduced in June 1983 as the 1984 Harley-Davidson FXST Softail. This basically was an FXWG Wide Glide, but instead of the visible twin shocks, the softail swingarm was used, with the shocks hidden under the gearbox, which at the time was still 4-speed with kickstarter and chain. Other companies had introduced rear suspension designs with invisible shocks, but for performance reasons. The Harley Softail was the first modern motorcycle intentionally designed to look as if it was decades older. Between gearbox and seat, the rather dull asymmetric battery box (right side) and black oil tank (left side) was replaced by the symmetric horse-shoe shaped chrome oil tank around the battery in the middle, another feature of the old hard tail era.

In addition, Harley had just completed the "buy back" from AMF, and had developed the all-aluminium Harley-Davidson Evolution engine that was more reliable that the Shovelhead, and had heads that looked like square versions of the round Panheads. It was first offered in the Softail, and helped making it a success.

== Other Harley-Davidson Softails ==
From 1986 onwards, Harley offered the Heritage Softail that copies the look of the 1950s Hydra Glide full dresser, with big front wheel, big head lights plus additional lights, big fenders, floor boards, saddle bags, windshield. By 1988, even the Springer front fork that was discontinued in 1948 was offered again, as a modern design with better bushings and a central damper. Even Heritage Springers were offered, that looked like the 1936 to 1947 Knuckleheads.

There have been many Harley-Davidson models with the Softail frame, including the Softail Standard, Custom, Springer Softail, Heritage Softail, Heritage Springer, Night Train, Deluxe, Deuce, Fat Boy, Softail Slim, the Dark Custom Cross Bones, the Dark Custom Blackline and Breakout. With the exception of the Deuce, which has a 2 in (51 mm) longer tank, these motorcycles have the same engines, transmissions, and frames, differing mainly in the fork, wheels, and accessories.

=== Front forks ===
The Softail model line has multiple front fork configurations. Historically, they have had Springer leading link forks, reminiscent of the sprung front-ends that were used before the Hydra-Glide in 1949. The FXST designation is used for 21" front wheel bikes or when the Springer fork is used with a 21" wheel, while the FLST designation is used for 16" front wheel bikes or when the Springer fork is used with a 16" wheel.

=== Engines ===
Because Softail models do not have rubber-mounted engines, they transmit more of the engine's vibration to the rider than the Touring or Dyna models (which have rubber engine mounts). To compensate, later Softail models used a counterbalanced version of the Twin Cam engine, the 88B, instead of the regular Twin Cam engine used in the Touring and Dyna models. This counterbalanced engine was enlarged to 96B and 103B before it was replaced by a variant of the Harley-Davidson Milwaukee-Eight engine for the 2018 model year.

=== New Softail from 2018 onwards ===
In 2017, Harley unveiled a completely redesigned Softail frame for the 2018 model year, the first major change since the introduction of the Twin Cam engine in 2000. The 2018 Softail frame uses a differently shaped swingarm suspended by a single rear shock absorber, mounted underneath the seat in a similar fashion to the original Haubert and Davis designs. Harley claims that the new chassis is significantly stiffer and lighter than the previous-generation Softail and Dyna platforms, the latter being discontinued with some of its models being carried over to the new Softail chassis. The 2017 Street Bob 103 ci was dyno tested and made 65 hp (48 kW) and 88 lb⋅ft (119 N⋅m) at the rear wheel. The new 2018 Street Bob 107 ci makes 77 hp (57 kW) and 101 lb⋅ft (137 N⋅m) at the rear wheel. The 114 ci motor such as in the 2018 Heritage Classic produces 81 hp (60 kW) and 108 lb⋅ft (146 N⋅m) at the rear wheel.

=== Customizing ===
The Softail is the most popular Harley-Davidson model family for heavy customizing and is often used for show bikes. Many aftermarket manufacturers around the globe have specialized in Softail parts & accessories like wheels, fenders or tanks to change the look of the custom motorcycle. Harley-Davidson also started an Inspiration Gallery to show their latest factory custom parts on all new models - many have their origin in CVO Softails, which are handmade Limited-Editions of the regular models.

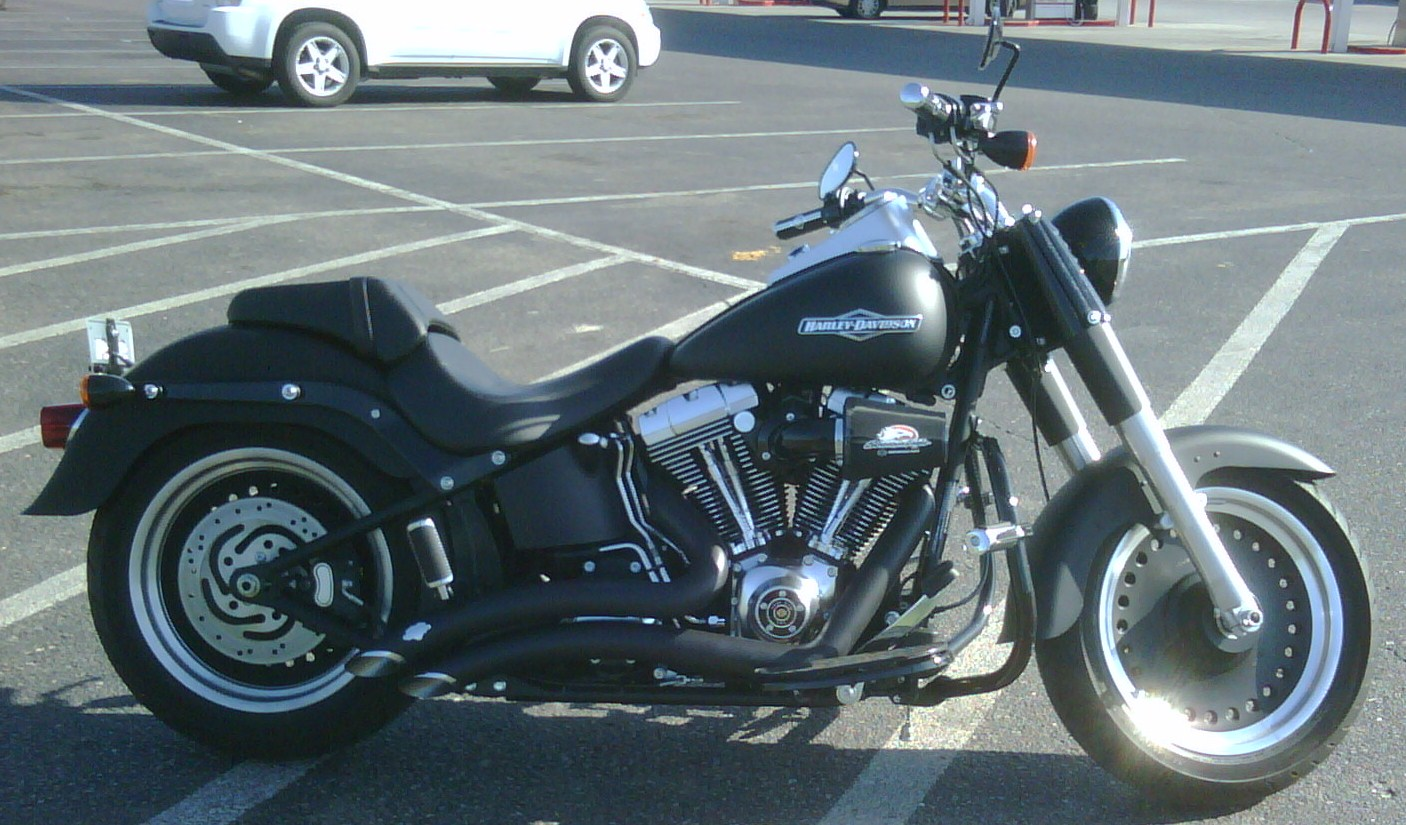
2011 Harley-Davidson FLSTFB Softail Fat Boy Lo

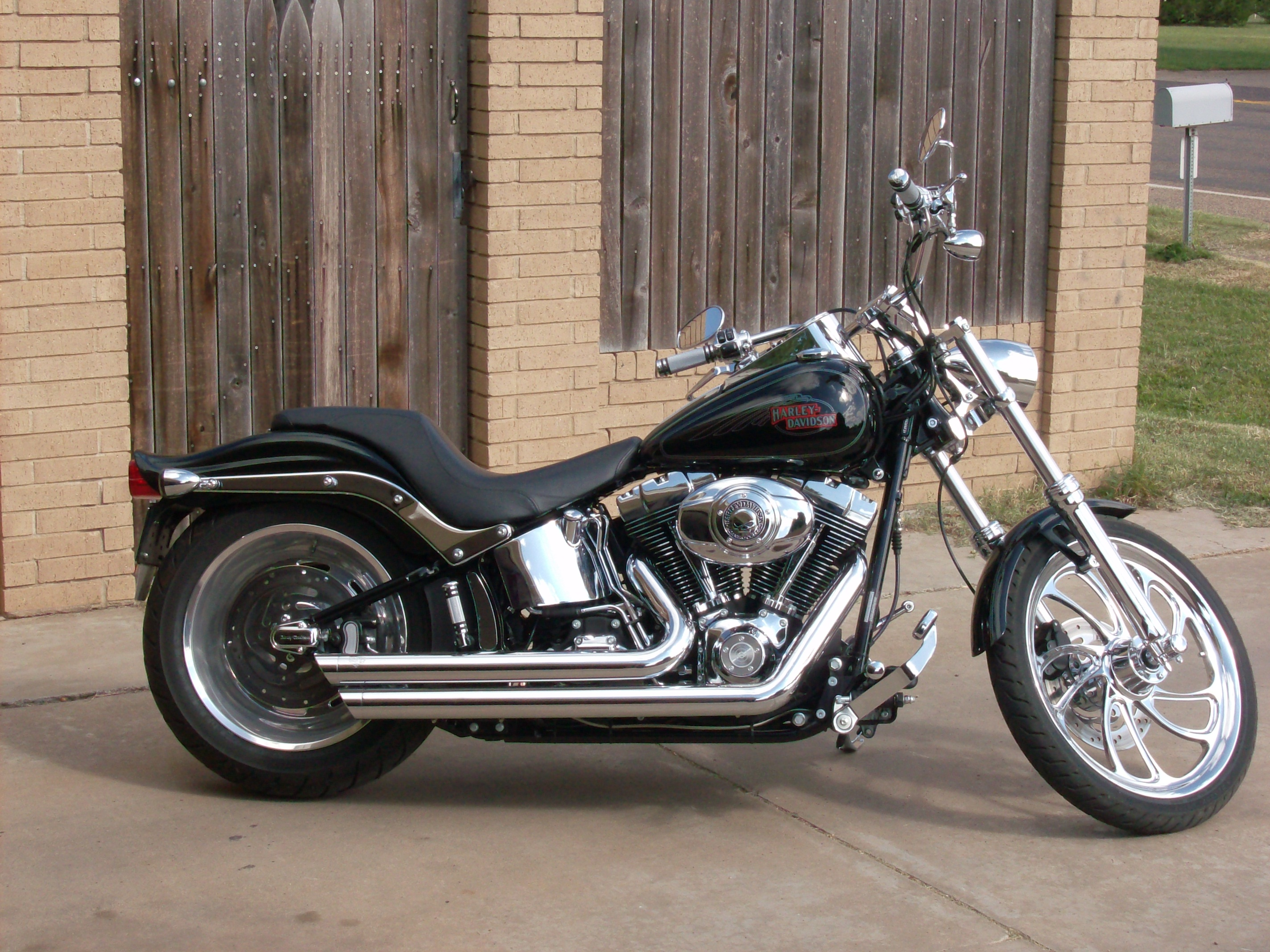
2008 Harley Davidson FXSTC Softail Custom

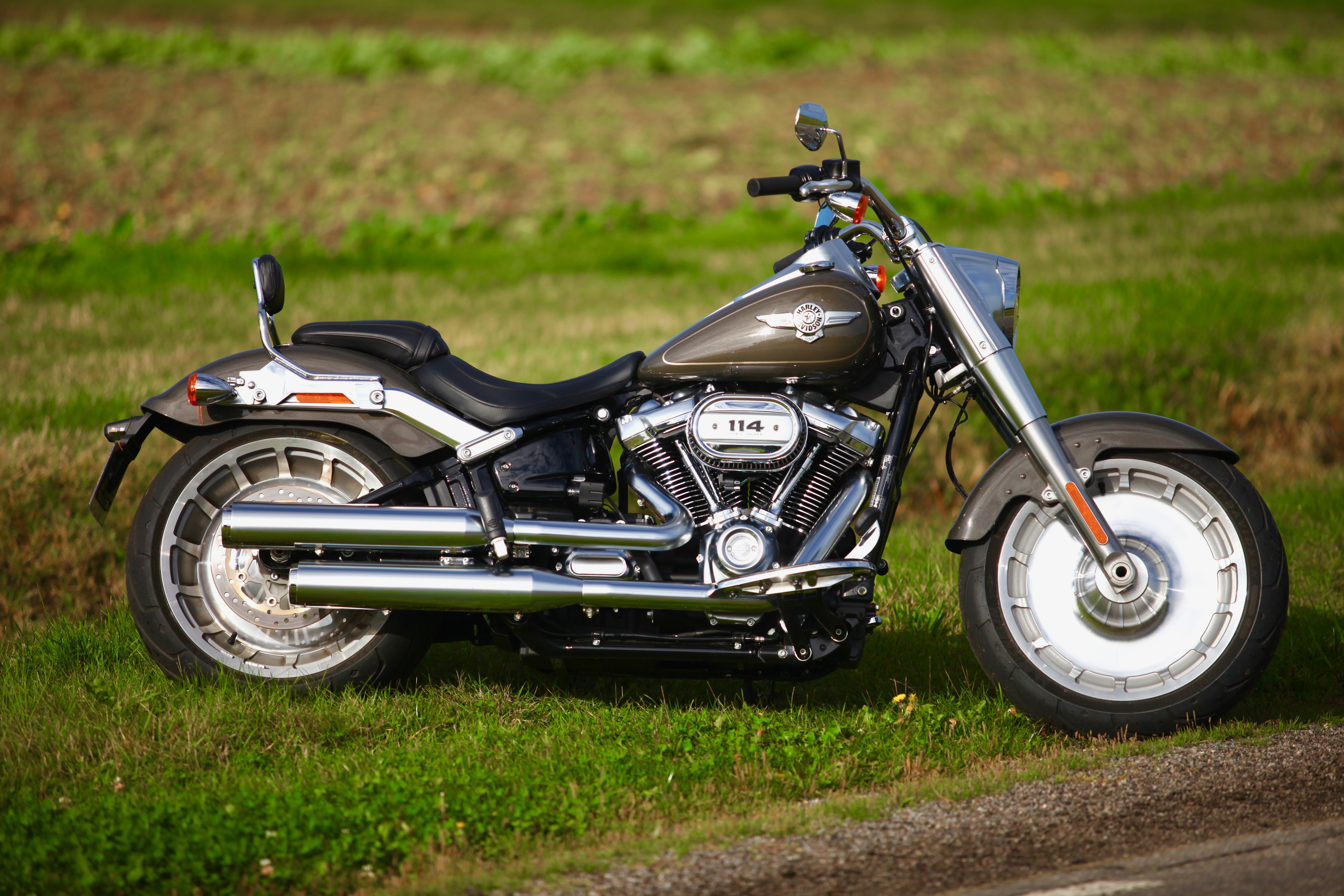
Harley Davidson Fat Boy 2018 FLFBS 114 ci

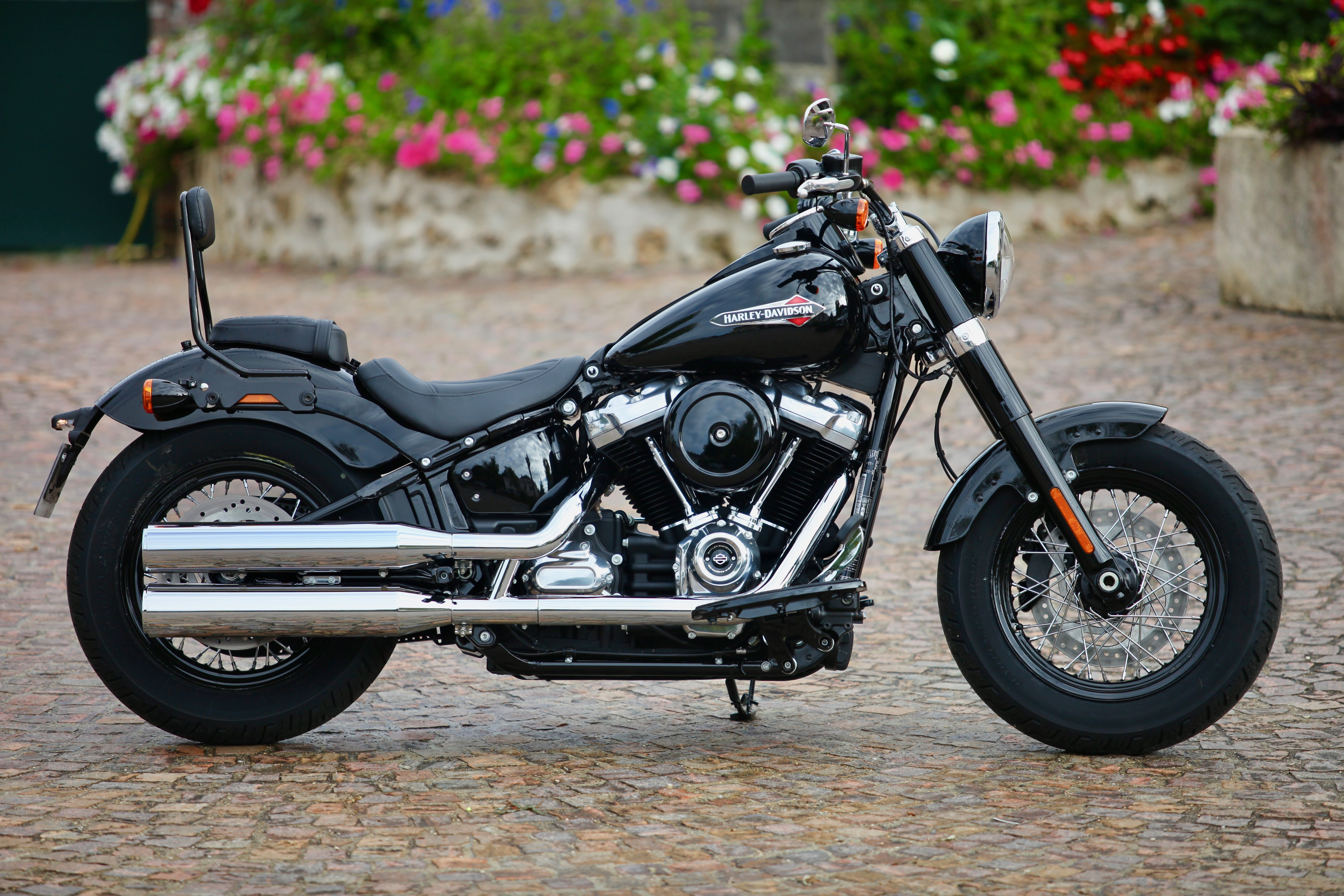
Harley Davidson Softail Slim 2018

== Softails by other brands ==
Other softail-style motorcycles:

- Honda VT600C (Shadow VLX)
- Kawasaki Vulcan 800, 900
- Suzuki VL 1500 Intruder LC / Boulevard C90
- Victory Vegas
- Yamaha Royal Star, Royal Star Venture
- Yamaha XV1600A (Road Star, XV1700)
- Yamaha DragStar 650, 950, 1100
- Zero Engineering Type 9
- Daelim VL Daystar

== See also ==
- Bicycle suspension
- List of Harley-Davidson motorcycles
