= Harley-Davidson Twin Cam engine =

American motorcycle engine

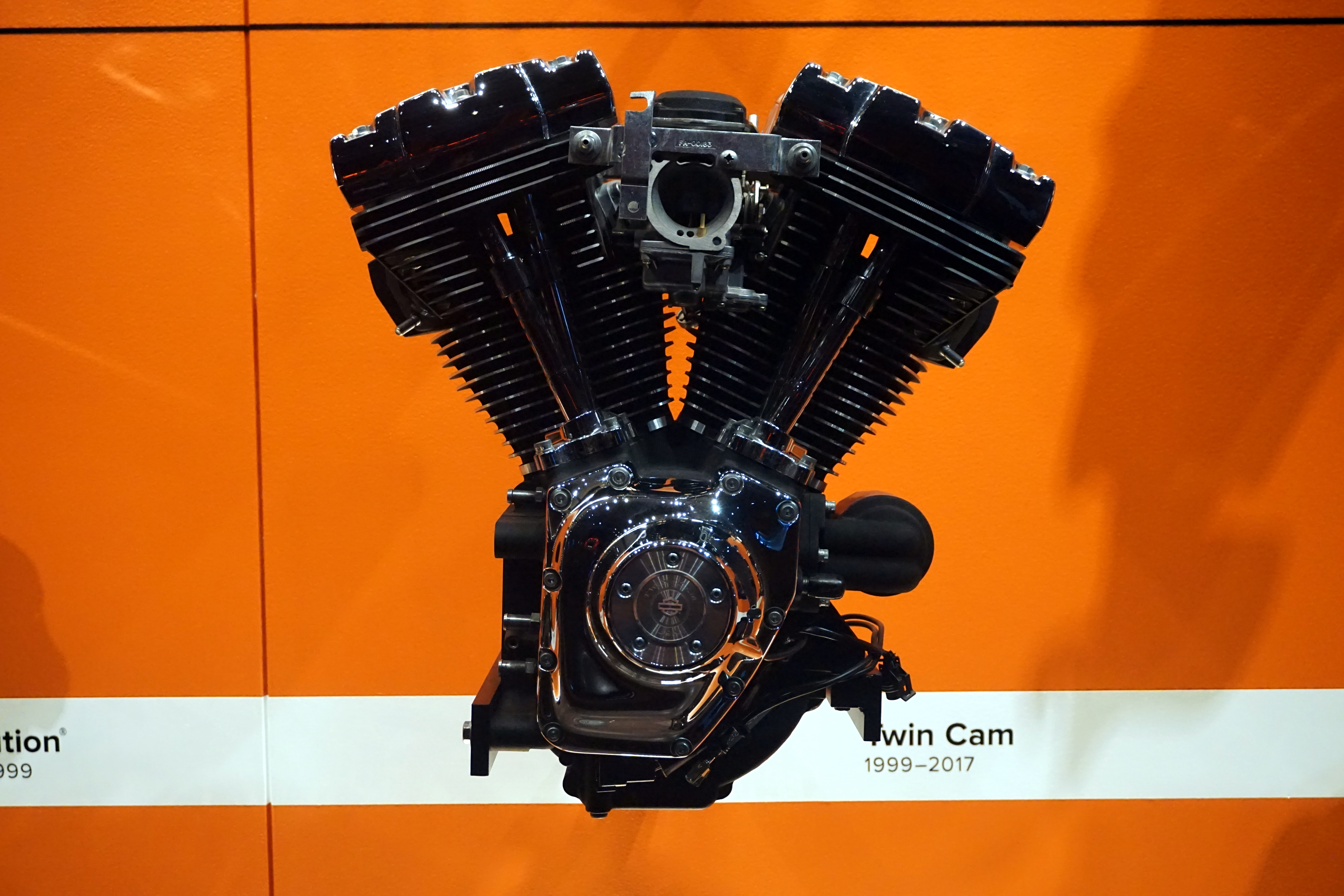
Harley-Davidson Twin Cam engine at the Harley-Davidson Museum

The Harley-Davidson Twin Cam are motorcycle engines made by Harley-Davidson from 1998 to 2017. Although these engines differed significantly from the Evolution engine, which in turn was derived from the series of single camshaft, overhead valve motors that were first released in 1936, they share a number of characteristics with nearly all previous Harley-Davidson OHV engines. Both engines have two cylinders in a V-twin configuration at 45°, are air-cooled (some touring models use liquid cooling for the heads), and activate valves with push-rods. The crankshafts have a single pin with a knife and fork arrangement for the connecting rods. These are sandwiched between a pair of flywheels.

The Twin Cam 88 was a traditional design from Harley-Davidson, as two cams to drive the valvetrain were used before, with the first being the famous '8-Valve' OHV V-twin racing models of 1915. Flathead engines have valves parallel to the piston, there are no additional pushrods, thus they need two matching cams per cylinder. The 1920s HD single-cylinder models (the A, AA, BA, BB, and Peashooter) used twin camshafts in the timing chest, while no less than four cams are used in the flathead V-twin engine models, like the VL and UL Big Twins, and the entire range of 45ci (750cc) V-twins from 1930 onwards: the Models D and W and their variants, such as the WLA military motorcycle and WR racing motorcycle. The quad-cam layout was continued in the Sportster engines.

The Twin Cam 88 was released for the 1999 model year in September 1998. The Twin Cam 96 was released for the 2007 model year.

== 88B and 96B Engines ==
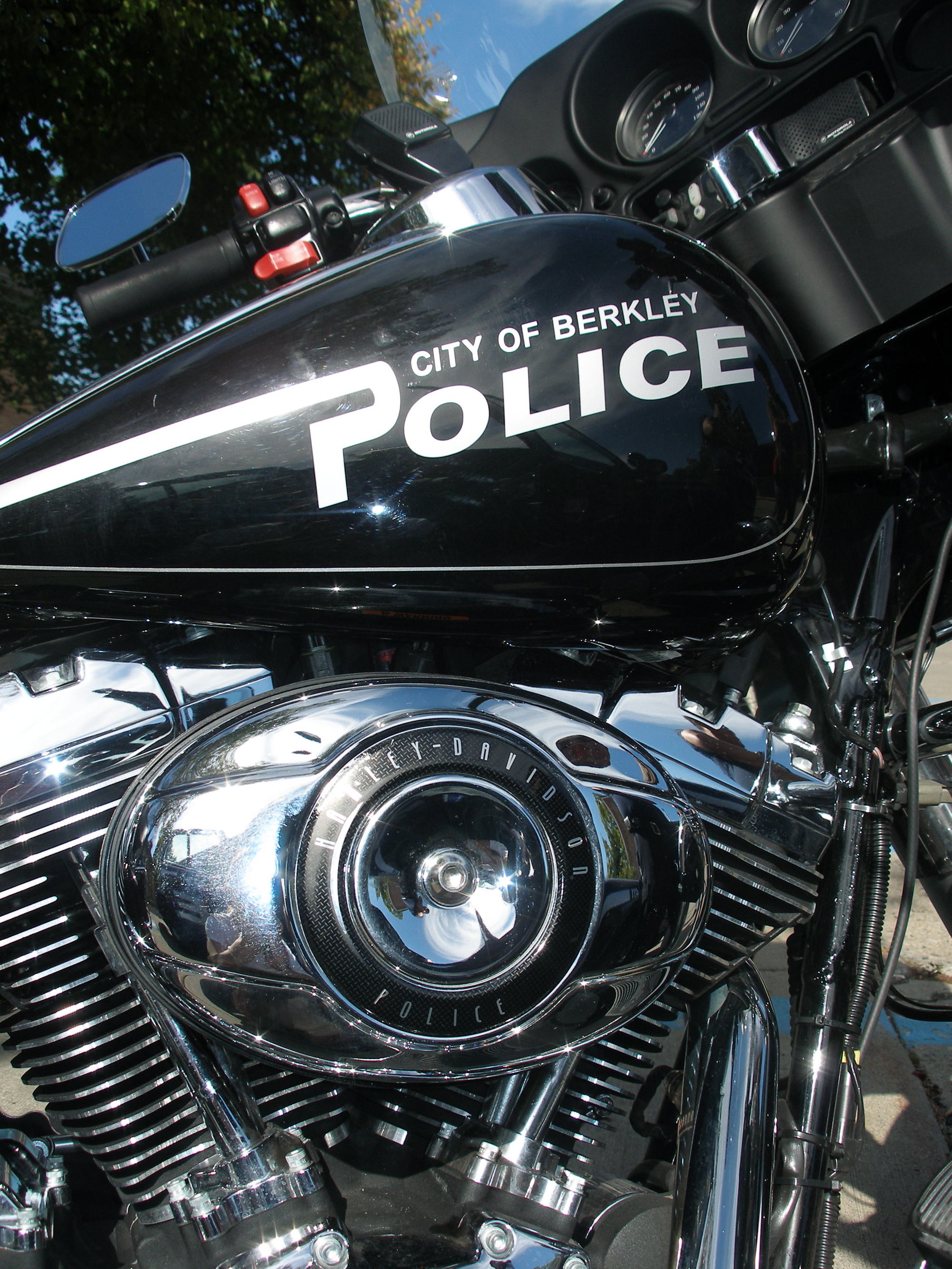
A police issue Twin Cam 96.

The Twin Cam initially was not used in the Softail model family before the year 2000. This was due to the chassis design and vibration transfer to the Softail frame as a result of the direct (hard) mounting of the engine. Dyna models are "rubber mounted", damping the majority of vibration transfer to the frame and rider. Another reason was that the engine and transmission on a Twin Cam are directly bolted (but are still separate units) to each other, with the traditional chassis seat post between engine and gear box on a Softail getting in the way of a Twin Cam transmission case. As the company determined that a rubber-mounted Softail would affect the line's visual styling, Harley solved the issue by designing an engine variant known as Twin Cam 88B. It is basically the same engine as the original (now retroactively referred to by some as "Twin Cam 88A"), but with a modified engine block design that incorporates twin chain-driven balance shafts. The Twin Cam 96B engine was released at the same time as the Twin Cam 96 model, for the 2007 model year, and was equipped on all Softail models until it was replaced by the 103 ci version.

It is however possible to mount a regular Twin Cam motor to a pre-2000 Softail (or any chassis that accepts an Evolution engine) through aftermarket adapters.

== Differences from predecessor (Evolution engine) ==
The engine design differed considerably from its predecessor the "Evo" although it shared some design elements with the Sportster line. The 88 represents the displacement in cubic inches of the standard engine. The bore is 3.75 in (95 mm) and the stroke is 4.00 in (102 mm), meaning the displacement is 88 cu in (1,450 cc). The Twin Cam 95 was introduced with the Screamin' Eagle (Later known as CVO) Models and ran until the 88 was discontinued after 2006. The Twin Cam 95 displaces 94.6 cu in (1,550 cc). The Twin Cam 96 displaces 96.7 cu in (1,584 cc). The company released 103 cu in (1,690 cc) for 2012 Electra Glide Ultra Limited models, and later for 2012 Softail models and 110 cu in (1,801 cc) for Screamin' Eagle/CVO Models.

Change	Evo	Twin Cam
Displacement	82 cu in (1,340 cc)	88 cu in (1,450 cc), 95 cu in (1,550 cc), 96 cu in (1,584 cc), 103 cu in (1,690 cc), 110 cu. in. (1,801 cc).
Oil pump	External. Connected through a series of gears.	Internal twin-gerotor. Connected directly to the right side pinion shaft. This pump is more efficient, maintains a higher pressure and larger volume.
Cams	Single, with 4 lobes.	One per cylinder, each with 2 lobes. This allows the push rods to be better aligned with the rocker arms.
Cam drive	Gears	Silent chain. This change was reported as necessary to meet EPA noise requirements. Many users installed aftermarket gear driven replacements to increase timing accuracy and to avoid cam chain tensioner wear.
Transmission attachment	Displaced from motor	Transmission casing is attached directly to the engine.
Oil tank	Usually surrounds battery box under the seat.	Below and behind the transmission assembly (except Softails, which are same as noted for the Evo)
Combustion chamber	"D" shape	"Bathtub" shape. Allows more efficient combustion and has higher compression.
Spark firing	Wasted spark (both plugs fire at the same time). The ignition system uses single coil. Plugs are 14 mm (0.55 in).	No wasted spark. The ignition system employs dual coils. Plugs are 12 mm (0.47 in).
Cooling	Air-cooled	Also air-cooled. Increased cooling fin areas and an oil jet that sprays the bottom of the pistons provide additional cooling capability.

== Development ==
Development of the Twin Cam started in the early 1990s, as Harley sought to address problems affecting the previous Evolution engine, particularly structural weaknesses within the crankcase, oil circulation and leakages. While aftermarket firms such as S&S Cycle previously responded with stronger crankcase components for high-performance Evolutions, Harley went for a completely new design, while keeping the engine fundamentally and aesthetically similar to the traditional 45-degree, air-cooled overhead valve V-twin.

The Twin Cam only shared 18 parts with its predecessor, as almost all of the components were unique to the engine. As the name implies, the engine uses two chain-driven camshafts, to comply with noise regulations, United States Environmental Protection Agency (EPA) and other markets. The drivetrain was reinforced through a mounting scheme called the "Revised Rear Interface", allowing the transmission case to be mounted directly to the rear of the engine, with the primary drive and clutch covers playing less of a structural role; this was also partly the reason for Softails not initially receiving a Twin Cam for the 1999 model year.

The early prototype Twin Cam engines had considerable trouble with the oiling system. These problems delayed release of the engine as scheduled for the 1997 model year. When the engines were run, oil came out any gasketed joint as well as the breather. Harley sought the help of Paul Troxler, a young engineer from Southwest Research Institute and eventually the problem was traced to a design which drained the cam case into the crankcase, and used a single scavenge pump. Due to airflow through ports in the crankcase wall, the cam case was not draining properly. After much testing, the solution was to seal the cam case from the crankcase and use a dual scavenge system, which was incorporated into the engine, rather than as an outboard pump as used on older Big Twins since the original Knucklehead. However, oil was still not scavenging properly from the crankcase, and this was traced to an acoustic phenomenon due to the caliber of the scavenge inlet. Restricting the diameter of the inlet, a counter-intuitive solution, solved that problem.

== See also ==
- Harley-Davidson engine timeline
