= Vision (game engine) =

Multi-platform 3D game engine

Havok Vision Game Engine
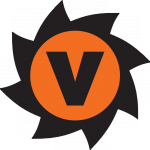
- Original author: Trinigy
- Developer: Havok
- Release: 2003; 23 years ago
- Final release: v2014.1.1 (Anarchy) / 1 January 2014; 12 years ago
- Type: Game engine (middleware)
- License: Proprietary commercial software

Havok Vision Game Engine is a discontinued, cross-platform, 3D game engine originally authored by Trinigy and later acquired by Havok. It was first released in 2003, and saw its final release in 2014. As of its eighth version, available target platforms were Microsoft Windows (DX9, DX10, DX11), Xbox 360, PlayStation 3, Nintendo Wii and Wii U, iOS, Android, Sony's PlayStation Vita, and most major browsers (IE6 and up, Firefox 2.0 and up, Google Chrome, Opera 9 and up).

Trinigy and its Vision Engine were acquired by Havok in 2011. Vision Engine has since been discontinued with no support being provided.
