= List of video game middleware =

Middleware for games is a piece of software that is integrated into a game engine to handle some specialized aspect of it, such as physics, graphics or networking.

== Notable ==
- Autodesk Gameware - from Autodesk, includes Scaleform GFx, Kynapse, Beast and HumanIK.
- Nvidia GameWorks - visual FX, physics, particle and fluid simulations.
- Simplygon - automated 3D content optimization for a variety of assets as vegetation, buildings, scene views etc.
- SpeedTree - vegetation programming and modelling software products.
- xaitment - customizable and modular game AI software for navigation mesh generation, pathfinding, character behavioral modeling and more.

=== AI: Pathfinding, collisions ===
- AiLive - a suite of game AI middleware.
- Kythera AI - complete AI toolset middleware.
- Mercuna - 3D navigation middleware.
- Havok AI - complete AI toolset middleware.

=== Full-motion video ===
- Bink Video - video file format, video compression tools and playback library from RAD Game Tools.
- CRI-Sofdec - created by CRI Middleware, it is highly used in Dreamcast games.

=== Online multiplayer ===
- DemonWare - created by Activision.
- Steamworks - used for Valve Corporation's Steam.

=== Physics & animation ===
- Cocos2D - 2D physics engine.
- Euphoria - 3D human animation engine created by NaturalMotion based on Dynamic Motion Synthesis.
- FaceFX - realistic facial animation engine created by OC3 Entertainment.
- Havok - 3D physics engine.

=== Real-time rendering ===
- trueSKY - real-time sky & weather renderer created by Simul Software.

=== Sound ===
- CRI-ADX - created by CRI Middleware, it is highly used in Dreamcast games.
- FMOD
- Miles Sound System - audio authoring tools and engine developed by RAD Game Tools.
- Wwise - audio engine and authoring tools from Audiokinetic.

=== UI ===
- Gameface - UI middleware engine developed by Coherent Labs.
- Autodesk Scaleform GFx - 3D UI middleware for the video game industry.

== See also ==
- Game engine
- Middleware
- Video game development
