= Autodesk Gameware =

Discontinued middleware software suite

Autodesk Gameware is a discontinued middleware software suite developed by Autodesk. The suite contained tools that enable designers to create game lighting, character animation, low level path finding, high-level AI and advanced user interfaces. On July 12, 2017, Autodesk removed Scaleform, Beast, HumanIK, and Navigation from their online store, and announced the ending of support for the products.

== Products ==
The Gameware suite consisted of the following modules:

- Scaleform: A vector graphics rendering engine used to display Adobe Flash-based user interfaces, HUDs, and animated textures for games, developed by Scaleform Corporation. Also includes Scaleform Video and Scaleform IME.
- Beast: A global illumination solution featuring natural lighting effects: color bounce, soft shadows, high-dynamic-range rendering, and lighting of moving objects in real-time game environments.
- HumanIK: A character animation middleware library with full body inverse kinematics. Can be integrated into animation engines such as Autodesk MotionBuilder.
- Gameware Navigation: Artificial intelligence middleware providing automatic NavMesh generation, pathfinding, and path following in complex game environments. Originally developed as Kynapse by Kynogon.
- FBX: Asset exchange technology that facilitates 3D data transfer between multiple software applications.

=== Beast ===
Autodesk Beast
- Original author(s): Illuminate Labs
- Developer(s): Autodesk
- Type: Middleware
- License: Proprietary commercial software
- Website: gameware.autodesk.com/beast

Beast is a content pipeline tool used for advanced global illumination and dynamic character relighting. Beast is developed and sold by Swedish games lighting technology company Illuminate Labs (acquired by Autodesk in 2010). Beast is used to make light maps, shadow maps and point clouds with advanced global illumination. Beast can precalculate lighting for light maps, shadow maps and point clouds, to bake occlusion or normal maps or to generate light fields for dynamic relighting of characters and objects.

Beast has built-in integration with Gamebryo Lightspeed and Epic's Unreal Engine, Evolution and several other in-house game engines. In March 2010, Unity Technologies announced that the next version of Unity would feature built-in Beast lightmapping and global illumination off the shelf. There is an API available for projects working with Beast but not ready for integration. The Beast API is a programming interface designed to make it as easy as possible to create a Beast integration with any game engine.

Beast has been used in games such as: Mario Kart 8, Mirror's Edge, CrimeCraft, Army of Two: The 40th Day, Mortal Kombat vs. DC Universe and Alpha Protocol.

The new Beast was presented at GDC 2010 in San Francisco. The new version of Beast features two entirely new modules called DistriBeast and eRnsT. DistriBeast is an extremely fast and easy to use distribution engine for managing render farms. eRnsT is a real-time visualizer that allows artists to explore and control the lighting set-up without having to run a complete bake.

== See also ==
- Autodesk Media and Entertainment
- Havok (software)
- Euphoria (software)
