= Darius A. Monsef IV =

American internet entrepreneur

Darius A. Monsef IV (Bubs)
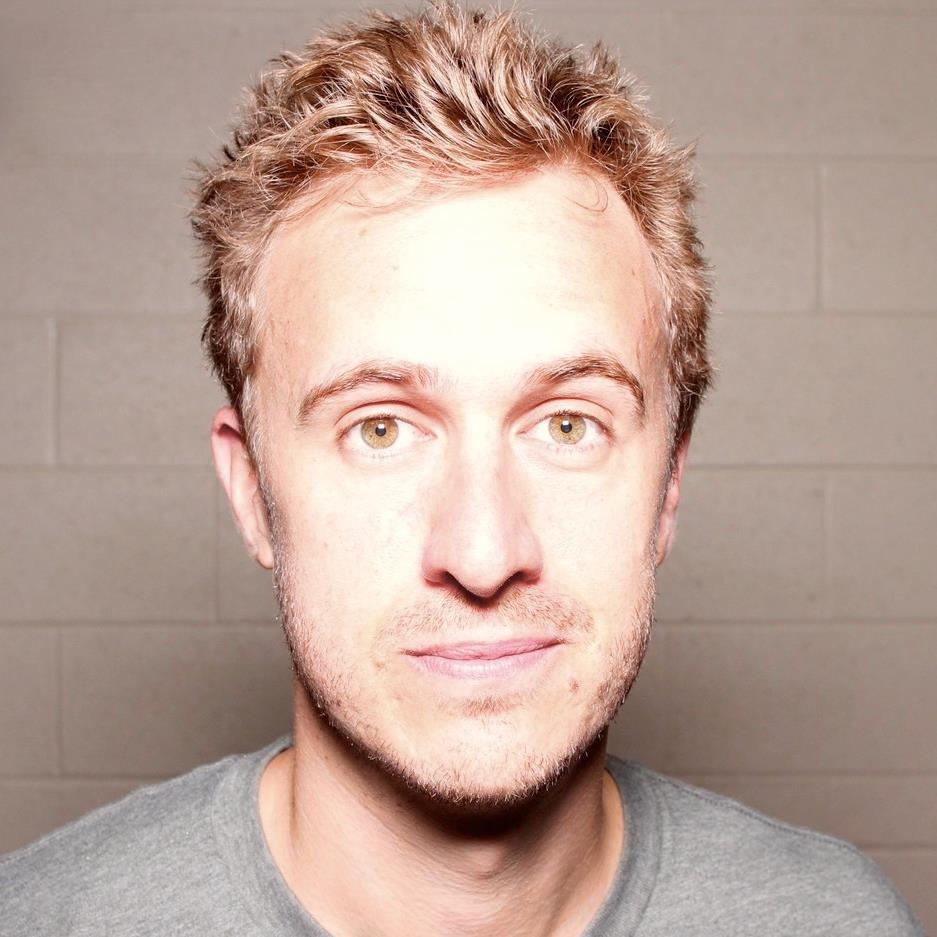
- Darius Monsef IV
- Born: September 26, 1981 (age 45); Honoka'a, Hawaii
- Website: www.bubs.co

Darius A. Monsef IV (born September 26, 1981, in Honokaa, Hawaii) is an internet entrepreneur & philanthropist known most widely as the founder of the design community COLOURlovers and co-founder & board member of the All Hands Volunteers international charitable organization. As an alumnus of Y Combinator and mentor with 500 Startups & PIE PDX, Monsef is an active participant in the internet startup community. He is also the author of the book Color Inspirations, published in 2011 by F+W Media and was named a "Design Visionary to Watch" by House Beautiful Magazine.

== Early life ==
Monsef was born in Honokaa, Hawaii and spent most of his childhood in his hometown of Kamuela, Hawaii until graduating from Parker School in 1999. After leaving Hawaii, Monsef lived in multiple cities across the United States including Portland, Oregon, Tucson, Arizona and Orlando, Florida.

== Career ==
=== Creative Market ===
Since 2011, Monsef has been working as CEO & co-founder of Creative Market. Launched in October 2012 by Aaron Epstein, Darius “Bubs” Monsef and Chris Williams, Creative Market is a platform for handcrafted design content from independent creatives around the world. Creative Market is passionate about making beautiful design simple and accessible to everyone. Based out of San Francisco, with total funding of $2.3 million, Creative Market is backed by Atlas Venture, Charles River Ventures, Longworth Venture Partners, SV Angel, CrunchFund, 500 Startups, Ludlow Ventures, Morado Ventures, Founder Collective, Seraph Group and Zelkova Ventures.

In 2013, Creative Market launched their new Photoshop Extension, that allows users to seamlessly download and use products from Creative Market without ever leaving the Photoshop software.

In 2014, it was announced that Creative Market was acquired by Autodesk for an undisclosed sum. The product and team joined Autodesk's consumer group at their Pier 9, San Francisco office.

=== COLOURlovers ===
In fall 2004, after Monsef took an "uninspiring" class on color theory at the Art Institute of Portland he began working on a website to allow people from around the world to share their color ideas and inspirations. Convinced that color was a fascinating topic that could be explored more deeply by the collective power of the internet, Monsef launched the COLOURlovers site in December 2004. Initially, the site functioned as a way to allow people to share, rate and comment on color combinations. As time went on, the number of registered users grew and its functionality expanded to encompass color trends as well a blog, forums, and other methods of interaction for its active user community. Monsef has curated one of the best online communities in the world, being nominated for a prestigious Webby Award as "The Best Community Website" of 2007 and subsequently in 2008, 2009, 2010 and 2011.

Monsef has continued to build the COLOURlovers community into a multimillion-dollar internet property. In May 2011, Monsef raised one million dollars for COLOURlovers from investors including Atlas Venture, Morado Ventures, Founder Collective, Charles River Ventures, 500 Startups, Seraph Group & Zelkova Ventures, Matt Mullenweg, Alexis Ohanian, Don Hutchison, Dharmesh Shah, Jared Friedman, and Shawn Bercuson.

=== Microsoft ===
In late 2008, Monsef was recruited by Microsoft to head up building community around their Photosynth technology where he spent 10 months working inside of the Live Labs incubator in Bellevue, Washington. He also led the redesign of the Photosynth website in 2009. In partnership with CNN, Monsef helped curate the Photosynth of the historical presidential inauguration of Barack Obama.

=== FriendsCall.Me ===
In April 2009, Monsef along with COLOURlovers co-founder Chris Williams launched FriendsCall.me as a service to help manage online social identities. The service searched more than one hundred online communities to check to see if a given username was registered or not. It also allowed registered members to create their own aggregated profile listing all of the places around the web they kept an active presence. Monsef and Williams launched the site after only working on it for a little over two weeks. Less than a year after launch, FriendsCall.me was acquired by KnowEm for an undisclosed amount.

== Philanthropy ==
=== All Hands Volunteers ===
In 2005, Monsef travelled to Thailand in the wake of the Asian tsunami to help those affected recover from the disaster. He joined a small group of backpacking volunteers in Bang Tao Village and stayed for 5 months to help manage the project as it grew. Monsef met retired technology executive David Campbell in Thailand and upon returning home to the U.S. they founded All Hands Volunteers (formerly known as Hands On Worldwide) as a 501c3 non-profit. Monsef served as Operations Director for All Hands Volunteer's Katrina Relief Project in Biloxi, MS organizing over 1,500 volunteers and delivering millions of dollars in volunteer labor and supplies. He was awarded the Key to the City of Biloxi for the work his organization did there. He also directed projects in Santo Domingo, Philippines and Pisco, Peru before stepping down from an operational role. He joined the All Hands Volunteers board of directors in 2009. In April 2011, Monsef and his wife Kaili travelled to Leogane, Haiti to spend their Honeymoon working with the All Hands Volunteers' project based there. He and his wife worked on a school he had raised $30,000 from friends and family to build.

== Awards and honors ==
- Key to the city, Biloxi MS
- Webby Awards, Best Community Nominee (COLOURlovers) 2011, 2010, 2009, 2008, 2007

== Speaking ==
- LessConf 2013
- Founder Fables 2013
- Innovation Expo 2012
- Hallmark Color Week 2012
- House Beautiful Design Institute 2012

== Bibliography ==
- Color Inspirations: More than 3,000 Innovative Palettes from the Colourlovers.Com Community (2011)
- Do Less (2011)
