= Skymotion =

Weather forecasting mobile application

SkyMotion
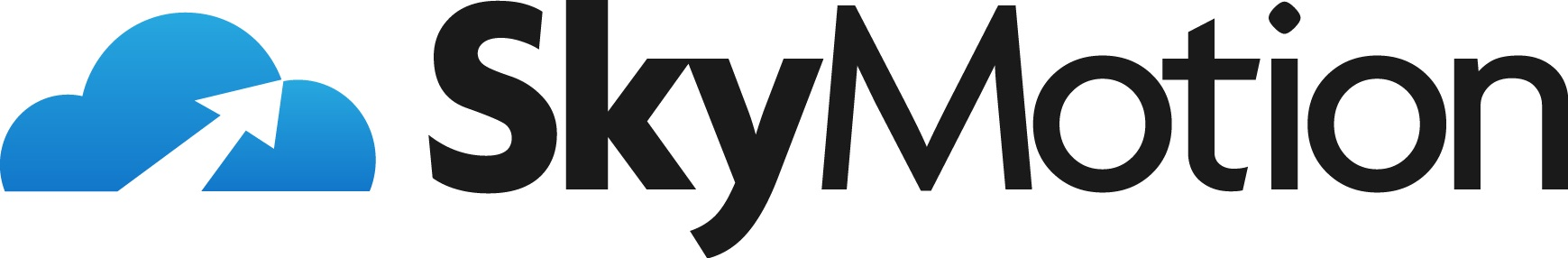
- Original author: André Leblanc
- Developer: Sky Motion Research Inc.
- Release: August 15, 2012; 14 years ago
- Operating system: iOS 3.0 or later; Android 1.0 or later
- Size: 4.7 MB
- Type: Weather
- License: Freeware
- Website: skymotion.com

SkyMotion was a weather forecasting mobile application developed by Canadian firm Sky Motion Research Inc. Its main suite of mobile applications, SkyMotion, was first released for Apple's iOS system in August 2012. The firm has since designed and released a version for Android operating systems, as well as a desktop version.

SkyMotion tracks and predicts all precipitation in the United States and Canada in real-time, using Doppler weather radars and other weather observation tools. It currently forecasts rain, snow, freezing rain, ice pellets, and hail.

To ensure accuracy for each user, the app tracks conditions in square kilometer segments. The forecasts are displayed in one-, five-, and fifteen-minute intervals within a two-hour window.

André Leblanc, recipient of an Academy Award for the development and implementation of products Flame, Flint and Inferno, founded Sky Motion Research Inc in 2008.

In November 2013, AccuWeather acquired the company.
