= Colin Austin (Moldflow) =

Australian inventor (born 1941)

Colin Austin is an Australian award-winning researcher, engineer, and inventor of Autodesk product Moldflow Plastics design software.

== Biography ==
Austin was born in 1941 in Melbourne, Australia.

Austin graduated from Sheffield University in 1963. He worked as an R&D Manager for Johns Hydraulics, then worked as lecturer for RMIT University in Melbourne, Australia.

In 1978, Colin Austin founded company Moldflow (currently a subsidiary of Autodesk) devoted to simulation of injection molding. Colin developed Moldflow Plastics design software that transformed the international design of plastics moulds using scientific principles rather than 'gut feel'. After many years he became the most successful exporters of technical software in Australia, and more than 48 countries in the world used his software.

In 1997, Colin Austin founded a company named Waterright devoted to simulation of irrigation and producing soil sensors and software to fix common irrigation problems.

== Books ==
- Austin, Colin (1982). Moldflow philosophy book. Moldflow. ASIN B0006YKHFS.
- Austin, Colin (2004). Water, Wit and Wisdom. Waterright. ISBN 978-0646438146.
- Austin, Colin (2012). Resolving Climate Change 2. ASIN B009KEM0U0.
