= Aurigo Software =

American software company

Aurigo Software Technologies, Inc.
- Company type: Private
- Industry: Enterprise software
- Founded: January 2003
- Founder: Balaji Sreenivasan
- Headquarters: Austin, Texas, United States
- Key people: Balaji Sreenivasan (CEO)
- Services: Construction software; Capital program management software
- Number of employees: 600 (2025)
- Website: www.aurigo.com

Aurigo Software Technologies, Inc. is an American software company that provides capital program management software. It was founded in 2003 and is headquartered in Austin, Texas.

== History ==
Aurigo Software was founded in January 2003 by Balaji Sreenivasan, an alumnus of the National Institute of Technology, Tiruchirappalli, and the University of Florida, Gainesville. Its software was reported to be primarily used for capital program and project management by government agencies managing public infrastructure in the United States and Canada.

In April 2020, Autodesk acquired a minority stake in Aurigo, and the two companies announced a product integration partnership. In December 2020, Aurigo Masterworks became FedRAMP compliant for use by US federal government agencies.

In January 2025, the company opened a development center in Bengaluru, India.

== Operations ==
Aurigo develops cloud software products, including Aurigo Masterworks, Aurigo Essentials, Aurigo Primus, and Aurigo Lumina, which support construction management, capital planning, and program management.
