= Easyhome =

Chinese home-furnishing company

Easyhome New Retail Group Corporation Limited
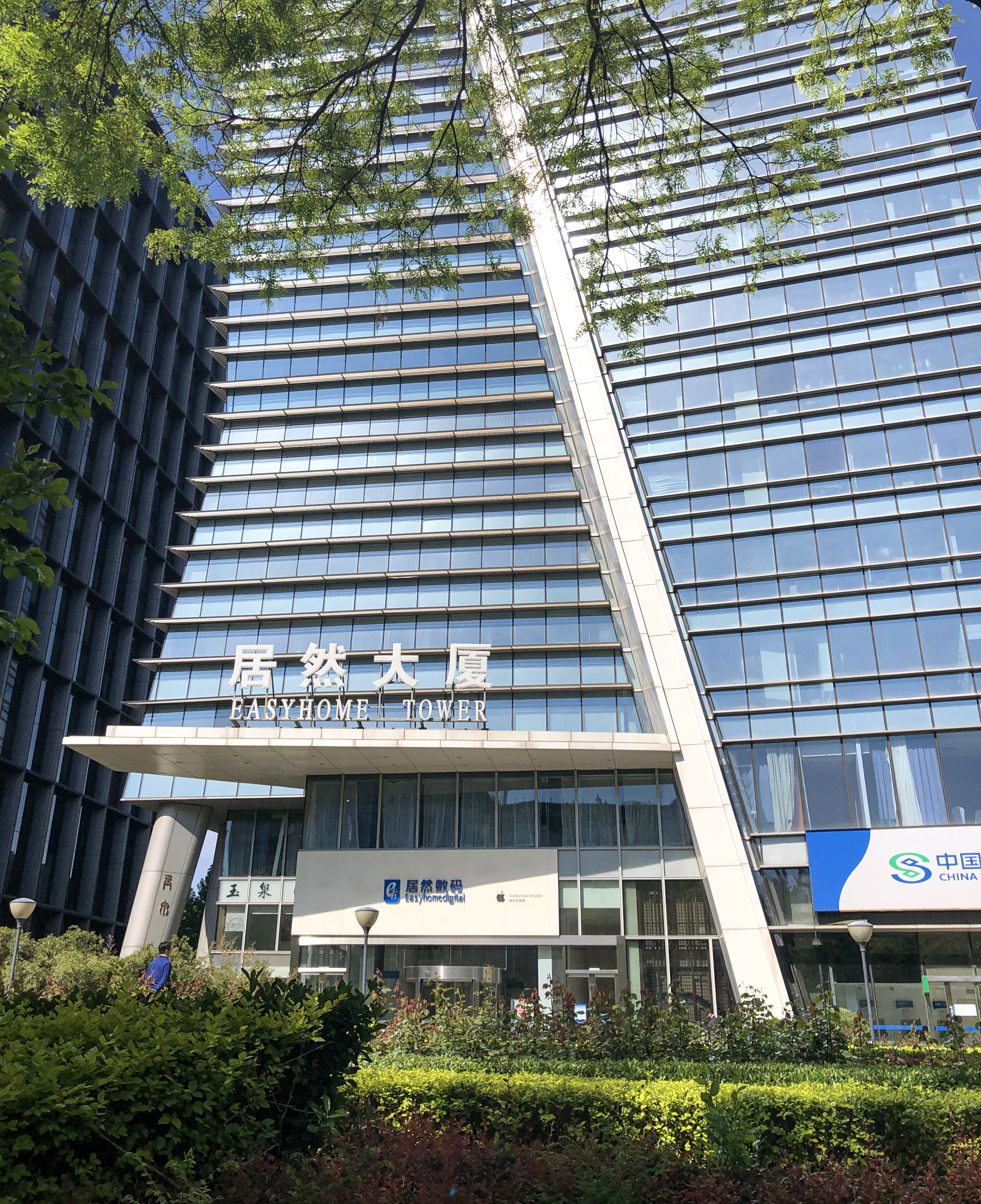
- Trade name: Easyhome
- Native name: 居然智家
- Romanized name: Jūrán Zhìjiā
- Formerly: 居然之家
- Traded as: SZSE: 000785
- Industry: Retail
- Founded: 1999; 27 years ago
- Founder: Wang Linpeng
- Headquarters: Beijing, China
- Number of locations: 372 home-furnishing malls (2025)
- Key people: Wang Ning (chairman and CEO)
- Products: Furniture, building materials, household appliances and smart-home products
- Services: Home-furnishing mall operation, retailing, interior decoration and digital design
- Revenue: CN¥11.144 billion (2025)
- Net income: −CN¥998.98 million (2025)
- Website: www.juran.com.cn

Easyhome New Retail Group Corporation Limited (居然智家新零售集团股份有限公司), abbreviated as Easyhome (Chinese: 居然智家; pinyin: Jūrán Zhìjiā) and formerly known as (Chinese: 居然之家; pinyin: Jūrán Zhījiā) is a Chinese home-furnishing retail and shopping-center operating company headquartered in Beijing, is a Chinese home-furnishing retailer and shopping-center operator headquartered in Beijing. The company operates directly managed and franchised home-furnishing malls, sells furniture, building materials, household appliances and smart-home products, and provides interior-decoration and digital-design services. Its shares are listed on the Shenzhen Stock Exchange under stock code 000785.

== History ==
Easyhome began operations in Beijing in 1999 under the leadership of Wang Linpeng. By 2018, it had developed into one of China's largest operators of home-improvement and furniture shopping centres. Its stores had generated more than RMB60 billion in sales during 2017.

In February 2018, Alibaba Group agreed to invest approximately RMB5.45 billion for a 15 per cent interest in Easyhome. Alibaba participated alongside other investors in a financing round that transferred a combined 36 per cent interest in the Easyhome operating company.

In 2019, Wuhan Zhongshang Group (武汉中商集团) agreed to acquire the entire equity interest in Beijing Easyhome Home New Retail Chain Group from Easyhome's existing shareholders. The transaction was conducted principally through the issuance of shares and valued the acquired business at RMB35.65 billion. Following the transaction, Easyhome Investment Holding became the listed company's controlling shareholder, Wang Linpeng became its ultimate controller, and Alibaba and its associated entities held approximately 14.37 per cent of the enlarged company.

The reverse merger was completed in December 2019, after which Wuhan Zhongshang was renamed Easyhome New Retail Group Corporation Limited in Chinese and adopted Easyhome as its stock abbreviation. The transaction preserved the listed company's original stock code, 000785.

In December 2024, the company's Chinese legal name was changed from "居然之家新零售集团股份有限公司", literally "Easyhome New Retail Group", to "居然智家新零售集团股份有限公司", incorporating a character associated with "intelligence" or "smart home". Its Chinese securities abbreviation was changed from "居然之家" to "居然智家" on 10 December, while its English name and stock code remained unchanged.

== Operations ==
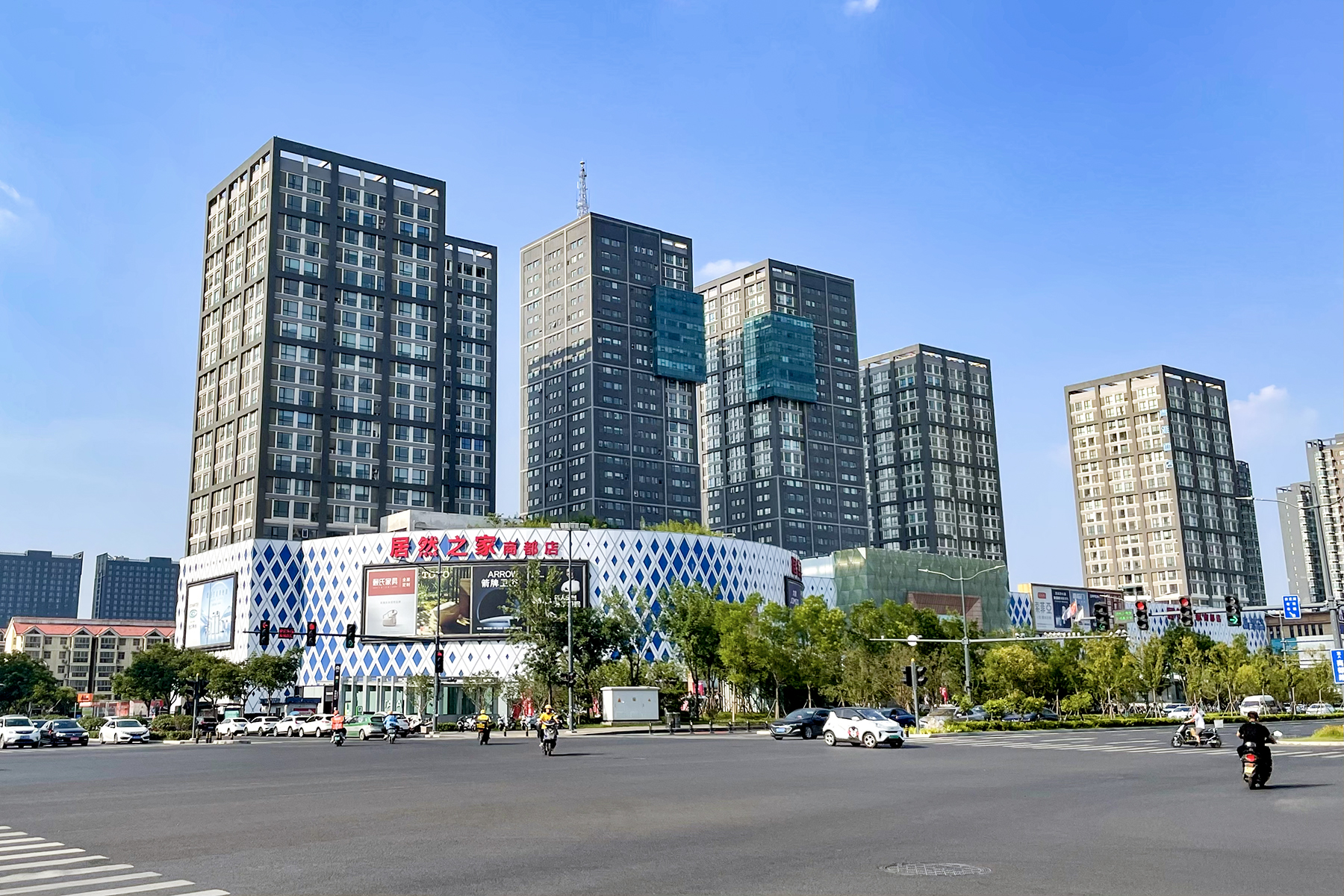
Easyhome Zhengzhou

Easyhome's principal business is the operation of large home-furnishing shopping centres. Its directly operated malls occupy either company-owned or leased properties, and the company derives income from rents, management fees and related services charged to furniture, building-material and household-goods merchants. Its franchised malls use the Easyhome name, operating systems and management services in exchange for franchise and management fees.

The group also conducts direct merchandise sales, interior-decoration services and smart-home retailing. Through the former Wuhan Zhongshang business, it has retained operations in department stores, general shopping centres and supermarkets, although home-furnishing malls constitute its principal business.

At the end of 2025, the company reported 372 operating home-furnishing malls, comprising 65 directly operated malls and 307 franchised locations. For that year, it recorded revenue of approximately RMB11.14 billion and a net loss attributable to shareholders of approximately RMB999 million.

== Digital platforms ==
Easyhome operates digital services for the home-furnishing industry alongside its physical retail network. These include Dongwo, also marketed as Doorverse, which provides management systems for shopping-centre operators and merchants; Easyhome iot., a retail and service platform for connected household devices; and Homestyler, an online interior-design service developed in cooperation with Alibaba Group.

=== Homestyler ===
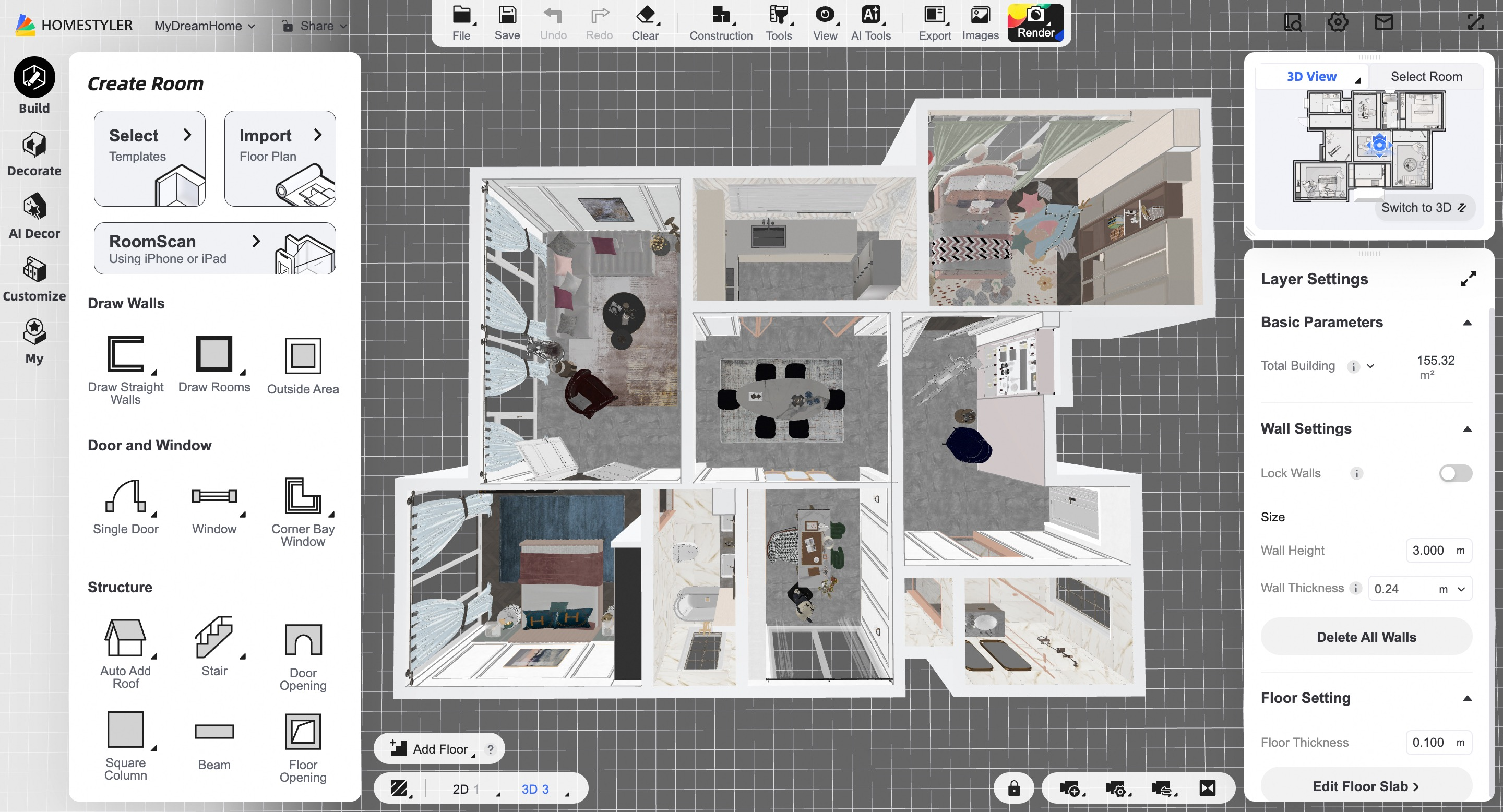
Homestyler

Homestyler is a interior-design software associated with Easyhome and Alibaba. It allows users to create two-dimensional floor plans, convert them into furnished three-dimensional interiors, place furniture and decorative objects from digital catalogues, and produce rendered images and videos. The platform is used by individual homeowners and interior designers, as well as by furniture brands, retailers and property companies seeking to display products or visualise residential interiors.

The service originated at Autodesk as Project Dragonfly, an experimental online floor-planning application released through Autodesk Labs in 2009. Autodesk formally introduced it as Autodesk Homestyler in April 2010. The initial service was offered as free web-based software for producing residential layouts in two and three dimensions and included both generic objects and digital models based on products from furniture, appliance and building-material manufacturers.

Easyhome and Alibaba jointly acquired Homestyler from Autodesk in 2016. Later versions added multi-storey floor planning, custom furniture modelling, material and tile editing, cloud rendering and video-generation functions. The platform has also incorporated generative artificial-intelligence tools for automatically furnishing rooms, modifying decorative styles and assisting with design proposals.

Designs created on the platform can incorporate digital models supplied by manufacturers and retailers, allowing products to be displayed within simulated residential spaces before purchase. Easyhome has also used the service in programmes directed at overseas designers, distributors and furniture businesses.
