= Tinkercad =

Browser-based 3D modeling program

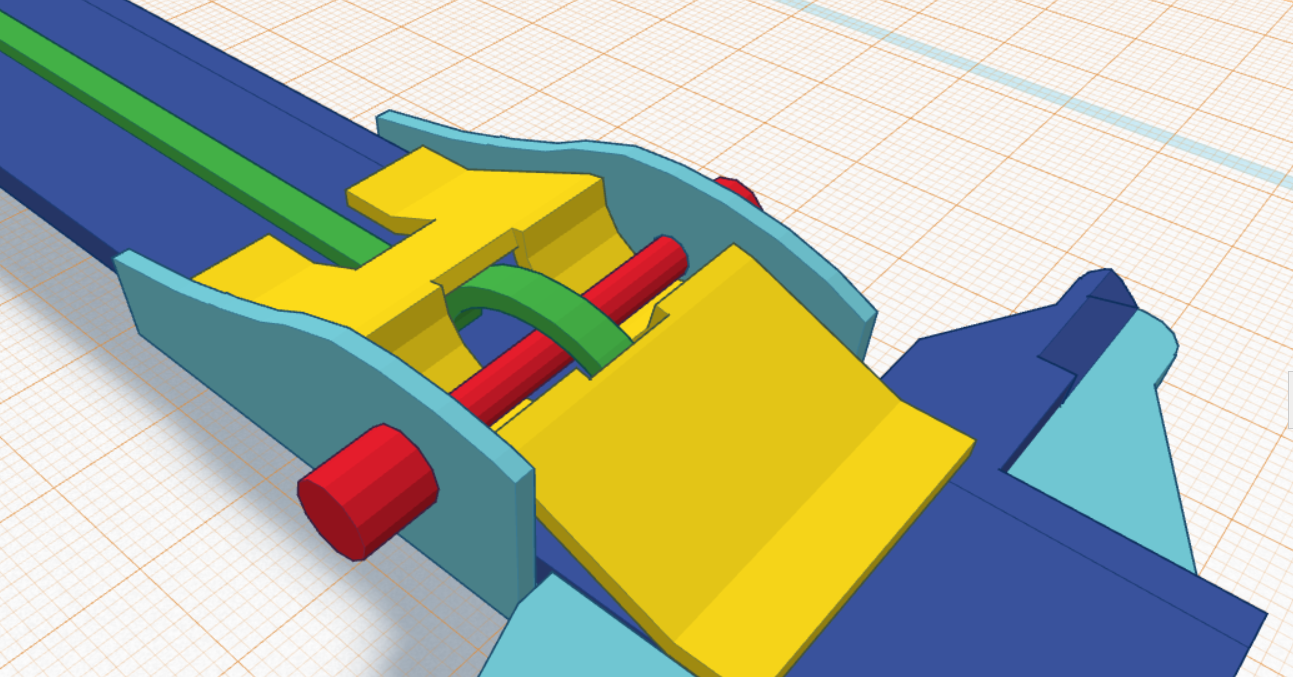
- Website type: 3D modeling, Computer Aided Design
- Owner: Autodesk
- Website: www.tinkercad.com
- Commercial: Yes
- Registration: Yes
- Launched: 2011
- Written in: WebGL, JavaScript

Tinkercad is a free-of-charge, online 3D modeling program that runs in a web browser. The platform is widely used in schools and beginner maker communities because its simple interface allows users with little or no prior experience to learn basic 3D modeling concepts. Since it became available in 2011, it has become a popular platform for creating models for 3D printing as well as an entry-level introduction to constructive solid geometry in schools.

== History ==
Tinkercad was founded by former Google engineer Kai Backman and his cofounder Mikko Mononen, with a goal to make 3D modeling, especially the design of physical items, accessible to the general public and allow users to publish their designs under a Creative Commons license. In 2011, the tinkercad.com website was launched as a web-based 3D modeling tool for WebGL-enabled browsers, and in 2012, the company moved its headquarters to San Francisco. By 2012, over 100,000 3D designs had been published by users.

In May 2013, Autodesk announced at a Maker Faire that it would acquire Tinkercad.

In March 2017, Autodesk recommended users of the soon-to-be-retired 123D Sculpt migrate to Tinkercad (or Maya LT). In May, Autodesk discontinued its 123D Circuits (Circuits.io) "Electronics Lab". The program's features were merged into Tinkercad.

== Concept ==
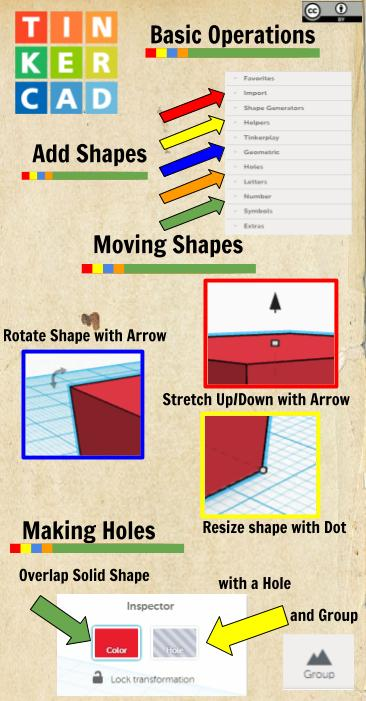
Illustration of basic operations in Tinkercad.

Tinkercad uses a simplified constructive solid geometry method of constructing models. The concept behind Tinkercad focuses on simplifying computer-aided design (CAD) so that beginners, students, and hobbyists can easily create 3D models using basic geometric shapes. A design is made up of primitive shapes that are either "solid" or "hole". Combining solids and holes together, new shapes can be created, which in turn can be assigned the property of a solid or a hole. In addition to the standard library of primitive shapes, users can create organic shapes with the Sketch tool and build custom shape generators using a built-in JavaScript editor.

Beyond making models, Tinkercad offers the ability to revisualize those models with Lego bricks. In addition, Tinkercad added a physics engine in early 2023 named "Sim Lab" that allows 3D models to dynamically interact with itself and the presence of gravity. Later updates to this feature included the addition of connectors for axles, joint, and slider connectors, as well as motors and the option to bind keyboard controls to such motors, further increasing the user interactability of the feature.

== File formats ==
Shapes can be imported in three formats: STL and OBJ for 3D, and 2-dimensional SVG shapes for extruding into 3D shapes. Tinkercad exports models in STL or OBJ formats, ready for 3D printing. also, it includes a feature to export 3D models to Minecraft Java Edition,

== Circuits ==
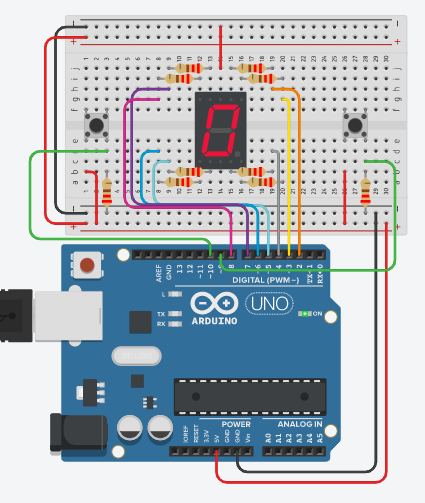
Tinkercad Circuits

Tinkercad's Circuits section is a browser-based electronic circuit simulator that supports Arduino Uno microcontrollers, Micro:bit boards, or ATtiny chips. Code can be created using graphical CodeBlocks, pieces of code that can be easily arranged with the mouse, or text-based code. Digi-Key praised Tinkercad in a 2022 article for its intuitive and fast tool capabilities, making it ideal for beginners. The program offers pre-built circuits called "Starters" or circuits that can be built using separate components.

Tinkercad comes with built-in libraries for popular components, including the Adafruit Neopixel, Arduino Servo, and I2C display libraries. However, custom libraries cannot be selected or uploaded. The simulator also supports analog components that are fully simulated.

Despite being an entry-level tool for programming and electronics, Tinkercad offers advanced features such as multi-board simulation and complex analog circuits for experienced users.

== See also ==
- Comparison of computer-aided design software
- List of 3D printing software
