= Ponoko =

Ponoko is an online service for distributed manufacturing and on-demand manufacturing.

== History ==
Ponoko was founded by David ten Have and Derek Elley in 2007 and launched in September the same year at TechCrunch 40. In 2009, Ponoko formed a relationship with 100K Garages, a decentralized network of shop-bot manufacturers in North America. In 2010, the company began forming similar relationships and opening offices in Europe in partnership with local manufacturing services Formulor, Vectorealism and RazorLkab.

In 2011, Autodesk announced a partnership with Ponoko as part of their 123D offering. Late in 2011, Autodesk announced the launch of 123D Make and 123D Catch offerings using Ponoko Personal Factory to offer fabrication services to users of these tools.

At Maker Faire 2012 Ponoko announced that they were the fabrication platform behind Local Motors Local Forge and MadeSolid.

== See also ==
- Mass Customization
