= Moldflow =

- Company type: Subsidiary
- Industry: Software
- Founded: Melbourne, Australia 1978
- Founder: Colin Austin
- Headquarters: San Rafael, CA, USA
- Products: Moldflow Adviser; Moldflow Insight
- Owner: Autodesk, Inc.
- Website: autodesk.com/moldflow

Moldflow is a producer of simulation software for high-end plastic injection molding computer-aided engineering. It is owned by Autodesk.

Autodesk stable release is Moldflow 2023.

Moldflow was founded in Melbourne, Australia as Moldflow Pty. Ltd. in 1978 by Colin Austin. In 2008 Moldflow was acquired by Autodesk for $297M.

Old logo of Moldflow Pty. Ltd.

== Products ==
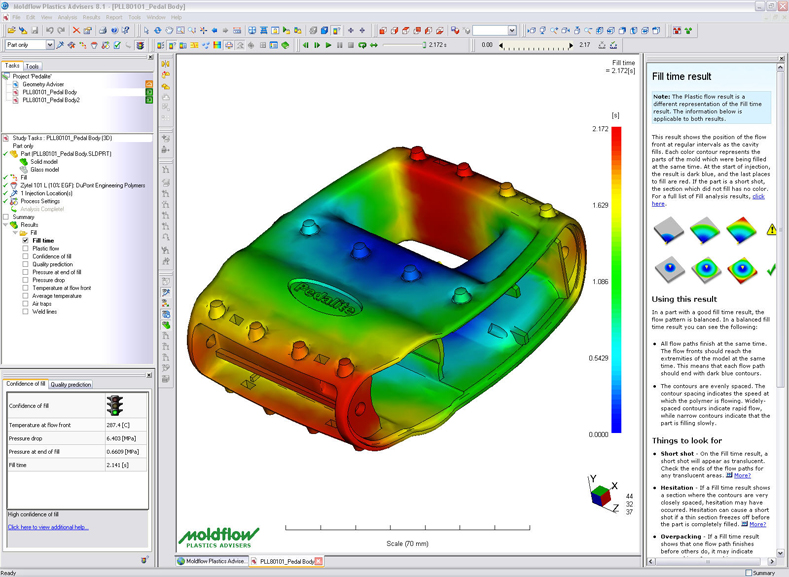
Moldflow Plastics Advisers software screenshot in 2008

Moldflow has two core products: Moldflow Adviser which provides manufacturability guidance and directional feedback for standard part and mold design, and Moldflow Insight which provides definitive results for flow, cooling, and warpage along with support for specialized molding processes. In addition, Autodesk produces Moldflow Design, Moldflow CAD Doctor, Moldflow synergy, Moldflow Magics STL Expert, and Moldflow Structural Alliance that serve as connectivity tools for other CAD and CAE software. They also have a free results viewer, Moldflow Communicator.
