= Autodesk Media and Entertainment =

Software company in Canada

- Type: Subsidiary
- Industry: Computer software
- Founded: Montreal, Quebec (1991 as Discreet Logic); San Francisco, California (1996 as Autodesk Kinetix); 2005 as Autodesk Media and Entertainment
- Headquarters: New York City, New York, United States
- Products: Maya; Maya LT; FBX; Softimage (discontinued); 3ds Max; Mudbox; Flame; Lustre; Smoke (discontinued); Beast; Shotgun; Scaleform; HumanIK; Navigation; Arnold; MotionBuilder; Stingray Game Engine (discontinued); Autodesk Media & Entertainment Collection; Wwise (under license from Audiokinetic)
- Parent: Autodesk, Inc.
- Website: www.autodesk.com/collections/media-entertainment/visual-effects

Autodesk Media and Entertainment is a division of Autodesk which offers animation and visual effects products, and was formed by the combination of multiple acquisitions. In 2018, the company began operating as a single operating segment and reporting unit.

== History ==
=== Discreet Logic ===
Montreal-based Discreet Logic was founded in 1991 by former Softimage Company sales director Richard Szalwinski, to commercialize the 2D compositor Eddie, licensed from Australian production company Animal Logic. Eddie was associated with Australian software engineer Bruno Nicoletti, who later founded visual effects software company The Foundry, in London, England.

In 1992, Discreet Logic entered into a European distribution agreement with Softimage, and shifted its focus on Flame, one of the first software-only image compositing products, developed by Australian Gary Tregaskis. Flame, which was originally named Flash, was first shown at NAB in 1992, ran on the Silicon Graphics platform, and became the company's flagship product.

In July 1995, Discreet Logic's initial public offering raised about US$40 million. On May 26, 1995, the company acquired the assets of Brughetti Corporation for about CDN$1 million, and in October acquired Computer-und Serviceverwaltungs AG, located in Innsbruck, Austria and some software from Innovative Medientechnik-und Planungs-GmbH in Geltendorf, Germany. After a 2-for-1 stock split on October 16, 1995, a secondary offering in December 1995 raised an additional $28 million. On April 15, Discreet invested $2.5 million in privately held Essential Communications Corporation.

=== Kinetix ===
Autodesk originally created a San Francisco multimedia unit in 1996 under the name Kinetix to publish 3D Studio Max, a product developed by The Yost Group.

In August 1998, Autodesk announced plans to acquire Discreet Logic and its intent to combine that operation with Kinetix. At the time, it was its largest acquisition, valued at about $410 million by the time it closed in March 1999 (down from an estimated $520 million when announced). The new business unit was named the Discreet division.

The combined Discreet-branded product catalog then encompassed all the Discreet Logic products, including Flame, Flint, Fire, Smoke, Effect, Edit, and Kinetix's product, including 3D Studio Max, Lightscape, Character Studio.

=== Media and Entertainment ===
In March 2005, Autodesk renamed its business unit Autodesk Media and Entertainment and discontinued the Discreet brand (still headquartered in Montreal).

Through the years, Autodesk augmented its entertainment division with many other acquisitions. One of the most significant was in October 2005, when Autodesk acquired Toronto-based Alias Systems Corporation for an estimated $182 million from Accel-KKR, and merged its animation business into its entertainment division. Alias had been part of SGI until 2004.

In 2008, it acquired technology of the former Softimage Company from Avid Technology.

In 2011, Autodesk acquired image tools and utilities that use cloud computing called Pixlr.

=== Industry usage ===
By 2011, these products were used in films that won the Academy Award for Best Visual Effects for 16 consecutive years. Much of Avatar's visual effects were created with Autodesk media and entertainment software. Autodesk software enabled Avatar director James Cameron to aim a camera at actors wearing motion-capture suits in a studio and see them as characters in the fictional world of Pandora in the film. Autodesk software also played a role in the visual effects of Alice in Wonderland, The Curious Case of Benjamin Button, Harry Potter and the Deathly Hallows – Part 1, Inception, Iron Man 2, King Kong, Gladiator, Titanic, Life of Pi, Hugo, The Adventures of Tintin: The Secret of the Unicorn and other films.

In November 2010, Ubisoft announced that Autodesk's 3D gaming technology was used in Assassin's Creed: Brotherhood.

== Products ==
The division's products include Maya, 3ds Max (the new name of 3D Studio Max), Mudbox, MotionBuilder the game middleware Kynapse, and the creative finishing products Flame, Flare, Lustre, Smoke, Stingray game engine (discontinued, but still supported until end of subscription).

=== Historical ===
- Discreet Frost, introduced in 1996, a SGI-based template-based on-air graphics system for news, weather and sports
- Matchmover, now bundled with 3ds Max, Maya and Softimage, Retimer and VTour. All acquired from RealViz
- Media Cleaner, a video-encoder for the Mac, and Edit, acquired from Media 100 in 2001
- Lightscape, real-time radiosity software for Microsoft Windows acquired in December 1997 by Discreet, was incorporated in 3ds Max in 2003.
- Discreet Plasma, released in 2002, a simplified version of 3ds Max for Adobe Flash authoring
- Discreet GMax, a simplified version of 3ds Max customized for game modders
- Autodesk Toxik, introduced in 2007, compositing software that allowed users to coordinate work on a production. The software could only be bought for a minimum of 3 PCs, underlining its focus on collaborative, database-driven workflow. With its collaborative functions and databases removed, and renamed "Composite", it is now bundled with Maya 3ds Max, and Softimage.
- Autodesk Softimage, acquired by Autodesk from Avid Technology in October 2008, was a 3D computer graphics application that was discontinued after the release of Autodesk Softimage 2015 on April 14, 2014. Softimage was used in the film, video game, and advertising industries for creating computer generated characters, objects, and environments
- Combustion - acquired in 1997 as Illuminaire Paint and Composition from Denim Software running on Windows NT and Mac OS. Rebranded as paint* and effect* and integrated into a suite with edit*. Finally unified as Combustion, a desktop shot compositor and motion graphics application for Mac OS and Windows. Shared some technologies and user interface elements with discreet systems-based products (Flame, Smoke).
- SketchBook Pro
- Autodesk Smoke - non-linear video editing software that integrates with Flame. When sold as a turnkey system, e.g. with an IBM Linux workstation, 2004 pricing started at US$68,000. A version for Mac OS X was announced in 2009, initially priced at US$14,995.

=== Creative finishing ===
IFF

Inferno, Flame, and Flint (collectively known as IFF) is a series of compositing and visual effects applications originally created for MIPS architecture computers from Silicon Graphics (SGI), running Irix.

Flame was first released in January 1993; by mid-1995, it had become a market leader in visual effects software, with a price around US$175,000, or US$450,000 with a Silicon Graphics workstation. Time with the software was typically rented at a post-production house with an operator. The Flame software is licensed in a variety of forms, including Flint, a lower-priced version of Flame with fewer functions, and Inferno, introduced in 1995, a version intended for the film market, with a price of about US$225,000 without hardware. Traditionally Inferno ran on the SGI Onyx series, while Flame and Flint ran on SGI Indigo^{2} and Octane workstations. Flame/Inferno were implemented on Linux in 2006. Autodesk said the use of more powerful hardware allowed complex 3D composites to be rendered more than 20 times faster than on the previous SGI workstations.

The first movie to use Flame was Super Mario Bros.; the software was then still in beta. The software also saw use on PBS's 1995 graphics package, designed by PMcD Design and animated by Black Logic.

At the 1998 Academy Scientific and Technical Awards, Gary Tregaskis (design), Dominique Boisvert, Phillippe Panzini and Andre Le Blanc (development and implementation) received a Scientific and Engineering Award for Inferno and Flame.

Flare

Flare, a software-only subset of Flame for creative assistants, was introduced in 2009 at around one-fifth the cost of a full-featured Flame seat.

Lustre

Lustre is color grading software originally developed by Mark Jaszberenyi, Gyula Priskin and Tamas Perlaki at Colorfront in Hungary. The application was first packaged as a plugin for Flame product under the name "Colorstar" to emulate film type color grading using printer lights controls. It was then developed as a standalone software. It was introduced through British company 5D under the Colossus name in private demonstrations at IBC show in Amsterdam in 2001. Alpha and beta testing were held at Eclair Laboratoires in Paris. During the trials, Colossus was running on the Windows XP operating system, but the same code base was also used on the IRIX operating system.

After the demise of 5D in 2002, Autodesk acquired the license to distribute the Lustre software, and later acquired Colorfront entirely. In the 2009 Academy Scientific and Technical Awards the original developers received a Scientific and Engineering Award for Lustre.

Flame Premium

In September 2010, Autodesk introduced Flame Premium 2011, a single license for running Flame, Smoke Advanced and Lustre together on a single workstation.
