= Autodesk Toxik =

Compositing software for visual effects

- Developer: Autodesk Media and Entertainment
- Initial release: 2007
- Final release: 2012 (included with Autodesk Maya)
- Operating system: Linux and Microsoft Windows
- License: Proprietary
- Website: autodesk.com/products/maya

Autodesk Toxik was an interactive node based, film compositing solution developed by Autodesk Media and Entertainment, a subsidiary of Autodesk, Inc.

== History ==
Autodesk Toxic is a film compositing software first released in 2007.

== Features ==
Autodesk Toxik includes several features such as collaboration-based workflows, dynamic page zooming (that allows faster processing when working with larger video formats), a paint module, a motion path animation, and a "Master Keyer" module. Toxik is based on modules: small extensions that allow Toxik to be adaptive. All modules were installed in Toxik 2008 by default because the module selection system in Toxik 2007 was inefficient.

== Current status ==
Toxik was integrated in Autodesk Maya in 2010 under the name Composite. It is now free but discontinued.
