= Autodesk 123D =

Hobbyist CAD and 3D modeling program suite

123D

- Developer: Autodesk
- Release: February 2009
- Stable release: 2.2 / September 21, 2016; 10 years ago
- Operating system: Windows 7 OS X 10.7 or later iOS
- Available in: English
- Type: 3D computer graphics software
- License: Freemium
- Website: www.123dapp.com

Cardboard assembly of a Trifoil 3D model planned in 123D Make

Autodesk 123D was a suite of hobbyist CAD and 3D modelling tools created by Autodesk. It is similar in scope to Trimble SketchUp and is based on Autodesk Inventor. As well as the more basic drawing and modelling capabilities it also has assembly and constraint support and STL export. Available for the software is also a library of ready-made blocks and objects.

Autodesk worked in collaboration with three companies (Ponoko, Techshop and 3D Systems) to make the software capable of creating physical objects from designs using 3D printing technology.

The 123D apps were discontinued by Autodesk beginning November 2016 and completing March 2017. The tools in the 123D suite were replaced by Tinkercad, Fusion 360, and ReCap Pro.

== Additional applications ==
The 123D suite consists of the programs:

- Catch: Creates 3D models from series of photographs taken at various angles using photogrammetry
- Sculpt+: Allows manipulation of virtual clay into a model
- Make: Allows creation of low-tech LOM-style solid models
- Design: Simplified program to create 3D models
- Creature: Allows creation of creatures in 3D on iPad
- Circuits: Virtual breadboarding and circuit design application
- Tinkercad: 3D printing app
- MeshMixer: A tool for working with mesh models

== Autodesk Catch ==
Catch uses photogrammetry technology to create a 3D model out of multiple pictures taken by the user. It does this by stitching together the images with common visual structures automatically, then asking the user to help connect points that could not be determined through software. Catch can be used to create 3D models of people, places, and things. With the creation of an Autodesk account, users can also export their newly created models to further manipulate in popular 3D modeling software.

The program is available for Windows, an app exists in the play store for Android, app store for iOS, and Windows Phone store.

=== Use ===
To create a 3D model in Catch the user should find a subject that can be easily photographed from many angles in good light. If the user is trying to create a 3D model of something with complex features they can take close up pictures on those areas to give better definition to the resulting model. Autodesk recommends taking between 30 and 40 pictures to create a well rounded model but when photographing larger subjects the user can take up to 70 pictures to give greater detail to the model. Once all of the images are saved they are uploaded to autodesk servers so they can be stitched together and a 3D model can be made. This process can take several minutes. Finally after they model is created it is downloaded to the user's device for viewing and editing. The 3D models created by Catch can be used in a number of ways such as 3D printing.

=== Sharing ===
Catch offers users the ability to view, comment on, rate, and download other users models. Likewise any user of the app has the option to share their creations with the autodesk community via Autodesk's built-in sharing functionality.

=== Limitations ===
Video of a 3D model of Horatio Nelson bust in Monmouth Museum, produced using 123D Catch.

Models featuring small parts or hair and fur can cause problems for the Catch software because the mesh created does not allow for such level of detail. When creating a model, the Catch software can have trouble stitching together images that feature reflective or transparent surfaces, even with the user's assistance. Catch can also fail to properly create a model if the subject moves or changes when the photographs are taken.

Catch processed the user's images on an Autodesk server, therefore internet connection was required. Autodesk servers may be unresponsive at times.

== See also ==
- Comparison of EDA software
- Blender - a comprehensive free and open-source 3D package
- MeshLab - a free and open-source tool similar to MeshMixer, extensively used by the scientific community
- Autodesk Meshmixer, software for manipulating and cleaning up 3D meshes.
