= ShotGrid =

Project management software

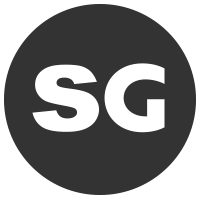
- Original author: Shotgun Software
- Developer: Autodesk, Inc.
- Initial release: 2009; 16 years ago
- Written in: Ruby on Rails, JavaScript, Python
- Type: Project management
- Website: www.shotgridsoftware.com

ShotGrid is a project management and production tracking software developed by Autodesk. It is widely used in visual effects, animation, and video game development for managing assets, tasks, and workflows throughout the production process of films, television series, and interactive media projects.

== History ==
=== Founding of company ===
ShotGrid Software was originally founded as Shotgun Software, by Don Parker and Isaac Reuben in 2006. They created it to build a project management tool for Disney's The Wild. Originally, the product focused primarily on production tracking and later added more functionalities.

The first version of Shotgun was released privately two weeks after the first code was written. Shotgun then spent three and a half years in private beta. The product was launched publicly in 2009 at SIGGRAPH.

=== Merger with Autodesk ===
In June 2014, Shotgun was acquired by Autodesk.

In 2017, Shotgun won an Engineering Emmy.

In February 2020, Don Parker announced Sarah Hodges would be taking over as head of Shotgun.

In February 2021, Don Parker and four other Shotgun employees were awarded Sci-Tech Oscars for the development of Shotgun in the Technical Achievement category.

=== Name change ===
In June 2021, Autodesk changed the name of the software to ShotGrid.

In March 2024, Autodesk changed the name again of the software to Flow Production Tracking.
