= Autodesk Lustre =

Color grading software

Lustre was a color grading software developed by Autodesk. It ran on Autodesk Systems certified hardware, as Flame Premium, Flame and Smoke Advanced. It is part of the Flame Premium package.

== History ==
=== Development ===
Lustre was originally a 5D product called Colossus, developed by Colorfront. After the demise of 5D in 2002, Autodesk acquired the license to distribute the Lustre software, and later acquired Colorfront entirely.

Lustre originated as a plugin for Autodesk's Flame product under the name "Colorstar" to emulate film type color grading using printer lights controls. It was then developed as a standalone software. It was introduced under the Colossus name in private demonstrations at IBC show in Amsterdam in 2001. Alpha and beta testing were held at Eclair Laboratoires in Paris. During the trials, Colossus was running on the Windows XP operating system, but the same code base was also used on the IRIX operating system.

The original creators of Lustre are Mark and Aron Jaszberenyi, Gyula Priskin, Tamas Perlaki, Gabor Forgacs, Ferenc Bechtold.

Lustre was integrated in the Flame Premium package.

The program was discontinued on April 11, 2024, with Lustre 2025 being the final version.

== Overview ==
The Lustre architecture uses CPU and GPU optimizations to obtain realtime playback on high resolution files, as required for digital cinema color grading.

The original control surface was the Tangent Devices CP100. Later Autodesk developed the Autodesk Control Surface manufactured by Tangent Devices. Since version 2012, Lustre also supports the Tangent Device Element, which is used by many grading applications on the market.
