= Creative Market =

Online marketplace for creative assets

Creative Market Labs, Inc.
- Available in: English
- Founded: 2012
- Headquarters: Seattle, {{{location_country}}}
- Area served: Worldwide
- Creators: Aaron Epstein, Chris Williams, Darius A. Monsef IV
- CEO: Adrien Piro
- Industry: Web Design, Photography, Graphic Design
- Employees: 20-50
- Website: https://creativemarket.com

Creative Market is an online marketplace for user-generated design assets. The company sells fonts, graphics, illustrations, mockups, icons, templates, web themes, stock photography, and other digital goods for use by web creatives. Creative Market has over 10 million users and more than 10 million purchasable items, available both as single purchases and as part of a monthly subscription offering. It was founded in 2012 by Aaron Epstein, Chris Williams, and Darius A. Monsef IV in San Francisco, California.

Initially, Creative Market went through three investment rounds, raising funds from notable Silicon Valley investors including 500 Startups, Y Combinator, CrunchFund, SV Angel, and Alexis Ohanian. In February 2014, the company was acquired by American multinational software corporation Autodesk for an undisclosed amount.

In 2017, Creative Market raised $7 million in a Series A financing round to spin out from Autodesk. In 2020, Creative Market was acquired by Dribbble Holdings, directly owned by Tiny. As of 2023, Creative Market Labs Inc. runs an independent operation that includes creativemarket.com, fontspring.com, and associated properties.

== History ==
Creative Market first began in 2011 as a venture between Aaron Epstein, Chris Williams, and Darius A. Monsef IV. Epstein, Williams, and Monsef were the co-founders of COLOURlovers, a Y Combinator-backed social network service that provides color inspiration for both personal and professional creative projects. The co-founders recognized that COLOURlovers was in need of a marketplace to help its community members exchange the digital goods they were creating, and hence created Creative Market.

In April 2014, the team launched a Photoshop extension that allowed designers to preview and purchase Creative Market's digital assets directly within Photoshop itself. This made it easier for designers to find and integrate third-party digital assets within the workflow of their existing graphic design environments.

In February 2014, Creative Market was acquired by Autodesk. The amount of the acquisition was not publicly announced. The entirety of the Creative Market team stayed with the company through the acquisition.

In 2016, Nicky Laatz became Creative Market's first shop owner to reach $1 million in earnings.

In May 2020, it was acquired by the online design community Dribbble. Shortly after, the team released Creative Market's Membership, a subscription offering that includes sitewide discounts and exclusive free assets.

Creative Market has continued to expand its catalogue consistently since launch, rolling out new categories like photos and 3D assets as well as emerging subcategories like Procreate brushes and Canva templates. In 2022, the site partnered with Shutterstock to expand its photo supply.

== Overview ==
Creative Market's community members buy and sell creative assets for use in design and marketing projects. Assets include fonts, templates, illustrations, mockups, vector graphics, website templates, stock photography, and a wide range of ready-to-license creative goods. As of 2023, over 10 million products were available for purchase on Creative Market.

Creative Market's content is submitted by their users through "shops." On behalf of their shop owners, Creative Market handles the distribution, payment processing, support, and assisted marketing for its products. Sellers retain a cut of the sale price on their goods, are not bound to exclusivity agreements with Creative Market, and set their own prices on goods they sell through the platform. The platform also provides sales statistics and a customer-seller messaging system.

== Membership ==
In 2021, Creative Market launched its design asset subscription. Creative Market's membership features sitewide discounts and exclusive access to free design goods every month.
