= Autodesk Vault =

Data management tool

A screenshot of Autodesk Vault Visual Data Management

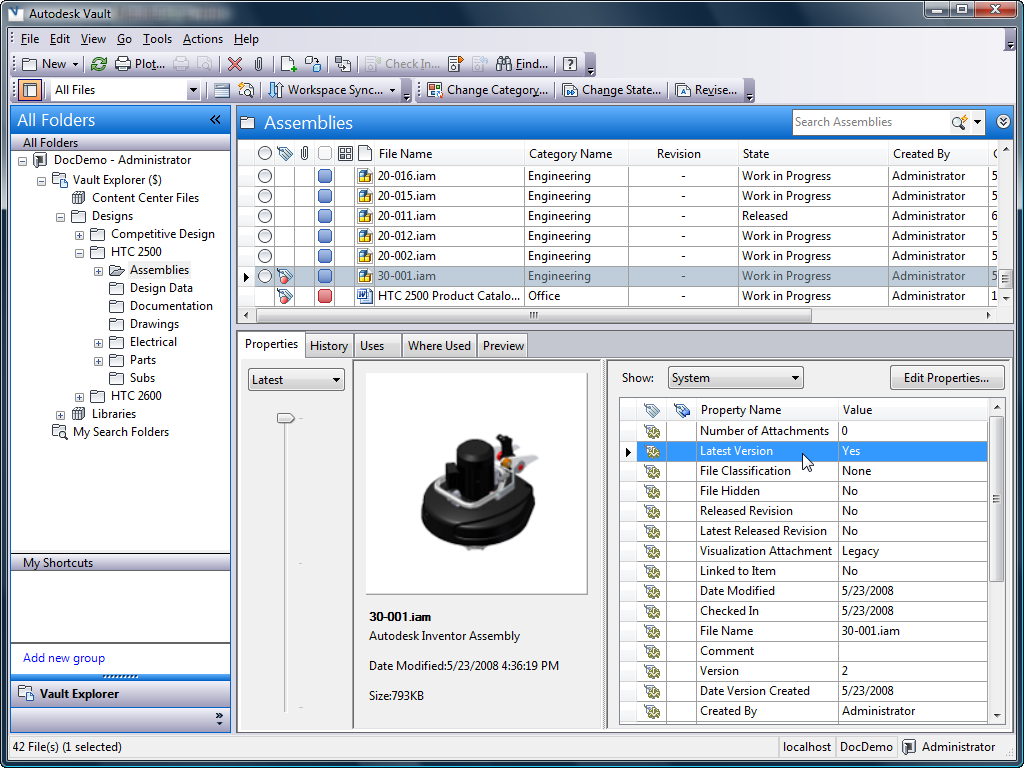
A screenshot of Autodesk Vault Workgroup 2010.

Autodesk Vault is a data management tool integrated with Autodesk Inventor Series, Autodesk Inventor Professional, AutoCAD Mechanical, AutoCAD Electrical, Autodesk Revit and Civil 3D products. It helps design teams track work in progress and maintain version control in multi-user environments. It allows them to organize and reuse designs by consolidating product information and reducing the need to re-create designs from scratch. Users can store and search both CAD data (such as Autodesk Inventor, DWG, and DWF files) and non-CAD documents (such as Microsoft Word and Microsoft Excel files).

== Overview ==
The Vault environment functions as a client server application with the central SQL database and Autodesk Data Management Server (ADMS) applications installed on a Windows-based server with client access granted via various clients such as: Thick Client (Vault Explorer) and Application Integrations. ADMS acts as the middleware that handles client transactions with the SQL database. Vault Explorer functions as the client application and is intended to run alongside the companion CAD software. The Vault Explorer UI (User Interface) is intended to have an appearance similar to Microsoft Outlook and can display the Vault folder structure, file metadata in the form of a grid and a preview pane for more detailed information.

Autodesk Vault is a file versioning system that "records" the progression of all edits a file has undergone. All files and their associated metadata are indexed in the SQL base data management system and are searchable from the Vault client interface. Other information about the files include version history, uses (composed of a list of children), "Where Used" (a list of all parents) as well as a light weight viewable in the form of the Autodesk Design Web Format (DWF) file which is automatically published upon check-in. When users intend to edit a file the file is checked-out and edits are made. When the user is satisfied with the changes the file checked-in and new file version, containing the new changes, is then available to other users in the workgroup. In-process file changes (file saves) are hidden from other users until the changes are checked-in. As files are edited, renamed and moved in the folder structure the Vault database automatically updates any file references in related files.

Vault is intended to be the core data management strategy for Autodesk's design products and therefore has add-ins to many of Autodesk's design solutions.

ADMS also plays another role as the hosts for Autodesk Inventor's Content Center (Standard Parts Library) for use by Inventor when it's desired that they are hosted in a central location.

== The Autodesk Vault Family of Products ==
The Autodesk Vault product family is a stack of products each offering incremental functionality over the previous product. While the base "Autodesk Vault" is included with many Autodesk design applications; additional functionality is available based on the needs of the organization. The following products are part of the Autodesk Vault Family.

- Vault - Work-in-Process Data Management
- Vault Workgroup - Customisation, Revision Management & Security
- Vault Professional - Professional Level Capabilities such as ERP Integration, Item Master and more

Note: For the 2011 Release, Autodesk Vault Manufacturing was Renamed to Autodesk Vault Professional. This was also formerly known as Autodesk Productstream in prior releases. The family was subsequently simplified for the 2014 Release with the retirement of Autodesk Vault Collaboration

== Functionality Matrix ==
Function	V	VW	VP
File Management Tools	--X--	--X--	--X--
Single Workgroup	--X--	--X--	--X--
Fast Searching	--X--	--X--	--X--
Autodesk CAD Integrations	--X--	--X--	--X--
Design Reuse Tools	--X--	--X--	--X--
File Revision Control and Lifecycles		--X--	--X--
Utilities for Batch Plotting		--X--	--X--
Automatic File Naming		--X--	--X--
Stand Alone Client for Non-CAD Users		--X--	--X--
File and Folder Security		--X--	--X--
Reporting		--X--	--X--
Server Based DWF Publishing		--X--	--X--
Custom Objects			--X--
Multi-Site Replication			--X--
Search, View and Print Web Client			--X--
Advanced Backup & Windows Authentication			--X--
Bill of Material Management			--X--
Engineering Change Management			--X--
Co-Exist with Enterprise Business Systems			--X--

Legend

- V - Vault (Base)
- VW - Vault Workgroup
- VP - Vault Professional

== History ==
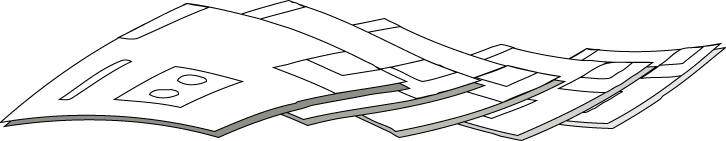
truEInnovations "Paper Stream" Logo.

Autodesk Vault was initially known as truEVault; part of an acquisition from a company called truEInnovations, Inc. based in Eagan, Minnesota. truEInnovations was started by two entrepreneurs, Brian Roepke and Dean Brisson in 1999. The company was founded on the basis of bringing a more affordable tool for managing engineering data to the market.

After the asset acquisition of truEInnovations by Autodesk in 2003, Autodesk began to further the integration of the product into the manufacturing product line, starting with Autodesk Inventor.

== Supported Applications ==
As of the 2015 release, the following applications are supported by Autodesk Vault.

Application	Version
AutoCAD	2021, 2014, 2013, 2012
AutoCAD Architecture	2015, 2014, 2013, 2012
AutoCAD LT*	2015, 2014, 2013, 2012
AutoCAD Electrical	2015, 2014, 2013, 2012
AutoCAD Map 3D	2015, 2014, 2013, 2012
AutoCAD Mechanical	2015, 2014, 2013, 2012
AutoCAD MEP	2015, 2014, 2013, 2012
AutoCAD Plant 3D and P&ID	2015, 2014, 2013 Ext 1
AutoCAD Civil 3D	2015, 2014, 2013, 2012
Autodesk Alias	2014, 2013
Autodesk Alias Automotive	2014, 2013
Autodesk Alias Design	2014, 2013
Autodesk Alias Surface	2014, 2013
Autodesk Simulation Mechanical	2014, 2013, 2012
Autodesk Simulation Multiphysics	2014, 2013, 2012
Autodesk Buzzsaw*	2014, 2013, 2012
Autodesk Inventor	2015, 2014, 2013, 2012,2011
Autodesk Inventor Professional	2015, 2014, 2013, 2012,2011
Autodesk Inventor LT*	2014, 2013, 2012
Autodesk Inventor Publisher	2013, 2012
Autodesk Inventor Fusion	2014, 2013, 2012
Autodesk 3DS Max	2014, 2013, 2012
Autodesk 3DS Max Design	2014, 2013, 2012
Autodesk Moldflow Adviser	2014, 2013
Autodesk Moldflow Synergy	2014, 2013
Autodesk Navisworks Simulate	2015, 2014, 2013, 2012
Autodesk Navisworks Manage	2015, 2014, 2013, 2012
Autodesk Revit Architecture	2015, 2014, 2013, 2012
Autodesk Revit Structure	2015, 2014, 2013, 2012
Autodesk Revit MEP	2021, 2014, 2013, 2012
Microsoft Office	2013, 2010, 2007, 2003
Microsoft Office Outlook*	2013, 2010

* These integrations are only available for Vault Workgroup and above. Not the base Vault

== Software Timeline ==
Release	Date	Products Shipped With
Autodesk Vault 1.0	July 2003	Autodesk Inventor 7 (as a subscription only download)
Autodesk Vault 1.3	September 2003	Autodesk Inventor 8
Autodesk Vault 2.0	January 2004	Available as a subscription only download
Autodesk Vault 3.0	June 2004	Autodesk Inventor 9
Autodesk Vault 4.0	March 2005	Autodesk Inventor 10
Autodesk Vault 5.0	March 2006	Autodesk Inventor 11, AutoCAD Civil 3D 2007, AutoCAD Electrical 2007, AutoCAD Mechanical 2007
Autodesk Vault 2008	March 2007	Autodesk Inventor 2008, AutoCAD Civil 3D 2008, AutoCAD Electrical 2008, AutoCAD Mechanical 2008, Autodesk 3ds Max 2008
Autodesk Vault 2009	March 2008	Autodesk Inventor 2009, AutoCAD Civil 3D 2009, AutoCAD Electrical 2009, AutoCAD Mechanical 2009, Autodesk 3ds Max 2009
Autodesk Vault 2010	April 2009	Autodesk Inventor 2010, AutoCAD Civil 3D 2010, AutoCAD Electrical 2010, AutoCAD Mechanical 2010, Autodesk 3ds Max 2010
Autodesk Vault 2011	March 2010	Autodesk Inventor 2011, AutoCAD Civil 3D 2011, AutoCAD Electrical 2011, AutoCAD Mechanical 2011, Autodesk 3ds Max 2011
Autodesk Vault 2012	March 2011	(Ships with various Suites as well as many new additional supported applications for the AEC market. See the list of supported applications for full details.)
Autodesk Vault 2013	March 2012	(Ships with various Suites as well as many new additional supported applications for Moldflow and Alias family. Additions to this release included Custom Objects, and a new Microsoft SharePoint Integration for Vault Professional.)
Autodesk Vault 2014	March 2013	(Ships with various Suites. Additions to this release included a number of improvements to the Autodesk Revit integration, Revision table functionality and overall performance.)
Autodesk Vault 2015	March 2014	(Ships with various Suites.)
Autodesk Vault 2015 R2	September 2014	(Professional Version only for subscription users. Multiple enhancements for item and BOM)
