= Capital program and project management software =

Capital program management software (CPMS) refers to the systems that are currently available that help building owner/operators, program managers, and construction managers, control and manage the vast amount of information that capital construction projects create. A collection, or portfolio of projects only makes this a bigger challenge. These systems go by different names: capital project management software, construction management software, project management information systems.

== Generic vs. construction project software ==
These systems differentiate themselves from 'generic' project management software, and from construction management software in that they are geared towards the way the project owner, not the contractor, architect, or engineer, manage project information and processes. Also, construction management software is more focused on single projects, and execution of construction administration processes, vs. capital program planning, design, and construction. The last 10 years have seen a shift in how project information is managed from the general contractor to the owner.

These systems are also geared towards managing a large portfolio of projects, not just a single project. There are a lot of software applications available that are suitable for managing a single project, but lack the reporting capabilities that would allow stakeholders to get summary data on project status and risks.

In its most basic form, capital program management software is a database that centralizes key project information related to processes, project scope, cost, and schedule. This software enables a methodical approach to data entry, process management, and information retrieval.

Capital program management software differs from generic project management systems in that the former leverages the lessons learned over hundreds, if not thousands, of projects to standardize how information is managed, controlled, and distributed. The software developers have in-house staff that are familiar with processes in construction, and the most common challenges facing construction professionals.

== Components ==
The most widely available CPMS systems include, at the very least, the following components:

- Document management – used to store a wide array of files that can include contracts, specifications, drawings, BIM models
- Process automation/workflow – used to map out a specific, repetitive and time-consuming process (e.g., budget change) in the software so that it follows a prescribed path in an automated fashion
- Schedule management and control – used to track the project schedule of one or more projects, depending on the number of projects corresponding to the overall program
- Cost control and management – replaces Excel spreadsheets by providing a controlled system that allows for the methodical entry of cost data, and automated tracking of changes to cost information (e.g., change orders)
- Reporting engine and dashboard creation – the engine that allows for stakeholders to make sense of all the data that's stored in the system, and enables informed decision making

== Types of information and related processes this software addresses ==
This information can manifest itself as cost items in a contract (e.g., construction costs, design fees, materials costs, FF&E costs, contingency costs, and more). Information can also relate to construction project schedules, and a broad range of processes whereby information is exchanged by the many stakeholders involved. These processes include payment applications, RFIs, change orders, budget changes, action items, submittals, transmittals, and a host of other communications.

=== Significance ===
For projects to be delivered on time, on budget, and within the predefined scope that was agreed upon at the beginning of any project, this information must be available to help project stakeholders (directors of construction, project managers, architects, engineers, contractors, subcontractors, suppliers, others) make informed decisions. Every day, construction professionals must make decisions that rely on accessibility to information. Project managers may delay responses because they're unsure of the validity of the information at their hands, or need to wait to consolidate information from multiple sources to be able to analyze the data. The accuracy and reliability of this information can make a difference between a project being delayed and going over budget.
This challenge is in addition to all the other decisions construction professionals face every day – unforeseen conditions, safety issues, quality control, and a host of other challenges. Capital program management software provides a platform where stakeholders can enter information, retrieve it in a way that makes sense by way of reports, summary screens, or dashboards, and maintain an audit trail (play by play) of what has transpired in a project. It is not uncommon for financial auditors or regulators (depending on the nature of the project and industry) to access these systems to determine compliance with existing regulations.
