= Scaleform Corporation =

Middleware provider in the video game industry

- Type: Subsidiary of Autodesk
- Industry: Video games
- Founded: Laurel, Maryland, U.S. (2004)
- Founder: Brendan Iribe, Michael Antonov
- Headquarters: Greenbelt, Maryland, U.S.
- Owner: Autodesk
- Number of employees: 30
- Website: Scaleform at Autodesk.com

Scaleform Corporation was a developer providing middleware for use in the video game industry. As a result of Autodesk's acquisition of the company in March 2011, Scaleform has become part of the Autodesk Gameware line of middleware. As of July 2017, Autodesk no longer makes Scaleform available for purchase.

== Products ==
- Scaleform GFx allowed licensees to create user interfaces using Adobe Flash authoring tools, such as Adobe Flash Professional; the resulting SWF files can be used directly by the GFx libraries, providing similar functionality to the Adobe Flash Player but optimized for use within game engines. Scaleform provides APIs for direct communication between Flash content and the game engine, and pre-built integrations for popular engines such as Unity and Unreal Engine. Scaleform GFx can also be licensed for use as a standalone Flash runtime system on mobile platforms, competing with Adobe AIR. The product was discontinued in 2018.
- Scaleform Video, a fully integrated video codec for Flash Video workflow support (currently powered by CRI Movie).
- Scaleform IME, a fully integrated Input Method Editor (IME) for Asian chat support.
