= Kynapse =

Computer game development middleware

Autodesk Kynapse
- Original author: Kynogon
- Developer: Autodesk
- Platform: PlayStation 3, PlayStation Vita, Xbox 360, Microsoft Windows, Mac OS X, Linux, Wii, Wii U
- Type: Middleware
- License: Proprietary commercial software
- Website: gameware.autodesk.com/kynapse

Kynapse is the artificial intelligence (AI) middleware product, developed by Kynogon, which was bought by Autodesk in 2008 and called Autodesk Kynapse. In 2011, it was re-engineered and rebranded as Autodesk Navigation.

Since the discontinuation of Autodesk Gameware, the product is obsolete.

== Features ==
- A complete 3D pathfinding
- An automatic AI data generation tool
- Optimizations for multicore/multiprocessing/Cell architectures
- Spatial reasoning
- Streaming mechanisms to handle very large terrains
- The management of dynamic and destructible terrains

== Usage ==
Kynapse was used in the development of more than 80 game titles, including Mafia II, Crackdown, Alone in the Dark 5, Fable II, Medal of Honor: Airborne, Sacred 2: Fallen Angel, Watchmen: The End Is Nigh, Sonic the Hedgehog (2006), The Lord of the Rings Online: Shadows of Angmar and the Unreal Engine. Kynapse was also used by companies such as EADS, BAE Systems or Électricité de France to develop military or industrial simulation systems.
