= Kynogon =

Computer software company

- Type: Private
- Industry: Software
- Founded: 2000
- Founders: Pierre Pontevia, Jacques Gaubil
- Defunct: 2008
- Fate: Acquired by Autodesk
- Headquarters: Paris, France
- Products: Kynapse
- Parent: Autodesk
- Website: www.kynogon.com

Kynogon was a computer software company that provided AI middleware to the video game and the simulation industries. The company was acquired by Autodesk in February 2008, and its flagship product was titled Autodesk Navigation (originally Kynapse). Autodesk ended the sale of Navigation in July 2017.

== History ==
Kynogon was founded in Paris, France in 2000 by Pierre Pontevia and Jacques Gaubil. It also had offices in Montreal and London. Kynogon successfully won many awards such as Red Herring 100 or Develop Industry Excellence.

Kynogon developed Kynapse, an artificial intelligence middleware platform for video games and simulation applications. The technology provided spatial awareness and navigation capabilities for characters operating in complex three-dimensional environments.

Kynapse was used in more than 80 video games, including Sonic the Hedgehog, Mafia II, Fable II, Medal of Honor, Crackdown and Lord of the Rings Online.

Kynogon’s technology was also used outside the video game industry. Kynapse was selected by companies including EADS and BAE Systems for simulation applications, including defense and security-related simulations.

In February 2008, San Francisco-based Autodesk announced an agreement to acquire Kynogon. Kynogon subsequently became part of Autodesk’s Game Technology Group, with its founders and team forming the core of the new group.

== Kynogon partners ==
In the video game domain, Kynogon maintains partnerships with console makers (Microsoft, Sony and Nintendo). Kynogon is a member of Epic Games's integrated partner program and Kynapse is available as integrated into the Unreal Engine. Kynogon also works with other complementary middleware developers (Ageia, Emergent Game Technologies, Trinigy).

In the simulation industry, Kynogon partners with MAK Technologies and is the developer of BHave, a plug-in to VR-Forces CGF.
