= CrimeCraft =

2009 video game

- Developer: Vogster Entertainment
- Publisher: THQ Inc.
- Engine: Unreal Engine 3
- Platform: Microsoft Windows
- Release: August 25, 2009
- Genre: Third-person shooter MMO
- Mode: Multiplayer

CrimeCraft was a free-to-play online Persistent World Next-generation Shooter dubbed "PWNS" by Ukrainian developer Vogster Entertainment and published at retail by THQ. The game is set in the near future where the world lies in anarchy and gangs have replaced governments.

CrimeCraft shut down on August 31, 2017.

== Overview ==
CrimeCraft was released at retail through an exclusive deal with Best Buy and THQ in the United States and Canada and online worldwide on August 25, 2009. In late October 2009, CrimeCraft received their first major patch update, which included an unlimited free trial. There have been regular updates to the game since that time to add more content and to fix several bugs that were present in the game at launch. Input by the community played a role in decisions for the future updates.

=== Expansions ===
CrimeCraft was periodically updated by the developers, adding new features, maps, gametypes, and community requests to the game. Vogster has released two expansions which include updates as well as extra content.

==== Bleedout ====
Bleedout is the first expansion for CrimeCraft and was released in autumn 2010.

The Bleedout campaign was broken up into episodes that were released weekly for ten weeks. These episodes have a set of missions, as well as art done by illustrators in the comic book industry. Each episode will progress through a small part of the Bleedout storyline and will be free to subscribed players. There will be a small fee for each episode for those players who do not have subscriptions. Some new features include: a new questing campaign, Belly Street, reworked style, reputation system that will measure a player's activity and new items and clothing.

Vogster partnered with American comic book company Archaia to expand on the new Bleedout storyline. Together, they released the Bleedout: The Graphic Novel which featured the artwork of the illustrators that have worked on the Bleedout campaign within CrimeCraft. Artists each contributed their own stylized illustrations to a separate chapter of the novel.

==== GangWars ====
CrimeCraft GangWars is the second expansion to CrimeCraft and was released in Winter 2011. It introduces a Quickplay Mode, new map La Famiglia Compound, new game mode Core Annihilation and Territory Wars.

== Gameplay ==
CrimeCraft revolves around gang warfare, combining role-playing elements as well as an MMO environment. A large, persistent city acts as the game's lobby where players can form gangs, accept missions and buy new weapons. The game consists of game modes which can be broken down into two major categories: PvP game modes, wherein players compete against each other, and PvE game modes, wherein players compete against computer controlled AI bots, as well as Core Assault, which is a hybrid of both PvP and PvE. Other features include questing, achievements, crafting and gang hideouts.

Lobbies are where players spend their time when they are not in combat instances. The players are able to talk to one another through chat, and barter items with one another. Players can also join groups, as well as gangs, which are equivalent to Guilds or Clans. Spread throughout all three lobbies, there are numerous Non-Player-Characters, where the players can either buy in-game items from them, or receive quests. One of the features included is crafting items such as weapons, clothing, and drugs. There is a large list of abilities and equipment each with different pros and cons.

Players can join instanced battles from the lobbies. These battles are where the shooter aspect of crimecraft takes place, and there is a good amount of diversity in the gametypes. Usually, these matches consist of two teams split into teams of 8.

=== Combat modes ===
==== Player vs. Player (PvP) ====
- Turf War – Two teams battle for control of five points spread out throughout the map. The first team to control all five points, or to have the most points when the match timer runs out, is the winner.
- Core Annihilation – Two teams fight through PvE bots and the opposing team to destroy the opposing team's core. The first team to destroy the opposing team's core, or the core that sustains the least amount of damage after time expires, wins.
- Assault, Capture, and Defend - Two teams fight to capture a single core that appears randomly on the map after each round. After one team captures a core, they must then defend that core from being released. Points are rewarded for the amount of time a core is captured before it finally gets released. The team that captures a core can not respawn until the core is released. The team that accumulated the most points before time expires wins.
- Snatch N' Grab - A typical Capture the Flag game mode between two teams.
- Robbery - Both teams start with a safe at their end of the map containing 100K in cash. Players must steal cash from the opposing player's safe in increments of 1K and bring it back to their own safe. The first team to have 200,000 in their safe, or to have the most cash in their safe at the end of the match, is the winner.
- Shootout - A typical team deathmatch style game. The team with the most points when the timer runs out is the winner. Extra points are awarded for special kills, such as multi-kills, grenade kills, knife kills, or killing higher level players.
- Riot - A typical death-match or free-for-all mode. Player with the most points when the timer runs out is the winner. Extra points are awarded for special kills, like multi-kills, grenade kills, knife kills, or killing higher level players.
- Capture the Zone - Two teams of 16 battle for control of three very large points spread throughout the map. Teams gain points based on the amount of time they have a fully captured point. The team with the most points when time runs out is the winner.
- Capture the Zone One Point – Following the same rules as Capture the Zone, this version only has a single zone to capture.

==== Player vs. Environment (PvE) ====
- Safeguard - A PvE mode where a group of players must protect precious cargo from wave after wave of non-player-character bots.
- Headhunt - A PvE mode where a group of players must fight through hordes of PvE bots to kill a boss located somewhere on the map. There are also 4 mini-bosses that can be optionally killed to lower the defense of the main boss and to reduce the frequency of PvE spawns.
- Stockpile - A PvE game mode where a group of players must search through a map filled with enemy bots in order to collect the supply containers hidden throughout.

==== Tournaments and Special Combat Modes ====
- Gangwars - Leaders of gangs can challenge another rival gangs to an agreed map and game mode. Each team wagers a certain amount of cash on the game. The winning gang keeps the money wagered by both teams.
- Territory Wars - Gangs fight for control over maps on the specific map. The gang that wins and gains control over a map will get paid taxes from any player that plays on that map as well as other rewards (small buffs while playing on that map).
- Daily Tournaments - Four player teams play in a bracketed tournament with a 1 loss elimination. Players progress through the brackets by winning matches. The last team standing wins. Players all receive in-game awards, but the award get better the farther that a team progresses with $10,000 in in-game cash for the overall winner.
- Weekly Tournaments - Players are allowed to enter the weekly tournament that takes place every Sunday. The weekly tournaments have legitimately more valuable rewards, and a tournament pass is needed to enter. To acquire a tournament pass, players must either win one of the daily tournaments, or buy a tournament pass with bronze coins, which are rewarded for completing the daily challenge.

=== Player customization ===
Players of CrimeCraft have the ability to customize their avatars in many different ways both cosmetically and statistically. Players can choose their weapons, clothing, abilities, boosts, and AUGS. All of these items have different pros and cons with use. Some items, such as weapons and can be customized even more so, specifically with weapon attachments and colorizing options.

==== Clothing ====
Players have a choice of many different pieces of clothing. These pieces of clothing are broken up into 5 separate categories: Head, Face, Body, Legs, and Feet. Each one of these categories can have one piece of clothing equipped to them. Clothing can be acquired in a few different ways. Players can buy them from other players, NPC vendors, the Auction House, or can acquire them as loot as a battle reward. The exception is the face category. Any items that can be equipped to the face can only be bought from the Black Market with Gold Bars. Each piece of clothing has its own resistances. These resistances allow incoming damage from enemies to be weakened. As a player levels up, he will be able to wear clothing that gives better resistances, thus decreasing the incoming damage even more so. Some pieces of clothing have special statistics, such as allowing a player to deal more fire damage, or to decrease enemy melee damage.

==== Weapons, attachments, and ammunition ====
Players can choose from an array of different weapons to suit their play style. Each player can bring up to three weapons with them into battle: One light, one medium, and one heavy weapon. Light weapons include pistols and SMGs. Medium weapons include shotguns and assault rifles. Heavy weapons include rocket launchers, grenade launchers, sniper rifles, and LMGs. There are multiple manufacturers of each type of gun, which consist of different stats.

Also, each weapon may have anywhere from 0-5 weapon attachment slots. These slots can be filled with various attachments to increase the statistics of weapons and increase their overall effectiveness.

Ammunition, sometimes called magazine upgrades, also can be equipped to each weapon. These upgrades work similar to attachments, but can only be used for a certain amount of time. Ammunition usually comes in stacks, with a maximum stack of 25. After every battle the player enters, one piece of ammunition is removed from the stack until it is depleted.

==== Skills ====
Skills, sometimes known as abilities, are special techniques that the player can use in battle to help them towards their goals. Each skill has its own unique statistics, some being as simple as allowing the player to throw grenades, while others will allow the player to become invisible for a period of time. The player can have up to three abilities equipped at one time. Abilities allow the player to customize the way that they would like to play in battle. Some abilities are more geared for defensive play, while others are for offensive.

==== Boosts ====
Boosts are a way for the player to increase certain statistics of their character temporarily in battle. Players are able to equip up to two boosts at one time. Boosts can be acquired by trading with other players, buying from the auction house or vender NPCs, and as reward drops from battle. Most boosts have pros and cons to them, meaning that will effectively help the player in one way, but hinder them in another. This makes the usage of boosts to be something the player must pay attention to and only use them at the opportune time. Some boosts to not have any negative effects, such as medkits, which are used to heal the player. Boosts all have a cooldown time, meaning that after they are used, a certain amount of time has to pass before the player is allowed to use them again.

==== AUGs ====
AUGs give indirect advantages to the player as they are playing the game. AUGs cannot be unequipped without them being destroyed, forcing players to choose which AUGs they would like to equip wisely. There are 3 types of AUGs: Combat, ability, and Lobby AUGs.

- Combat AUGs may affect things such as the amount of cash received at the end of a match, or lessen the boost cooldown time.
- Lobby AUGs may affect things such as the amount of cash given to players for selling items to NPC vendors, or reduce the required level to equip a certain item.
- Ability AUGs are slightly less common than other AUGs. These AUGs increase the effectiveness of certain types of Skills. They also are usually not permanent like other AUGs, but deplete similar to ammunition.

=== Gangs ===
Similar to clans in other games, players can join a gang. Gangs are groups of people that players can socialize with similar to that of a club. Players all share an emblem that appears on the back of their character, as well as have their gang name displayed with other information during battles. Gang members also have ranks, set in place by gang leaders and other higher ups, that allows certain permissions to be performed within each gang.

Gangs can be leveled up based on different goals that the gang must reach as a group, such as acquiring a certain number of players and paying a certain amount of cash. Higher level gangs will have more perks available to them, such as creating a gang hall or a club. A gang hall is a place that only gang members can enter, similar to an elite clubhouse. These gang halls have the ability to have everything a player would need inside that they normally would have to travel throughout the lobbies to get to, such as vendors and a mail box. There is also the ability to have a gang vault. The gang vault is a place where fellow gang mates can deposit money or unwanted items. These items and cash can be taken by other members of the gang and used however they would like. This allows gang mates to help each other out, and grow stronger as a whole. Each one of the perks mentioned does require a certain amount of cash to acquire.

Gangs also can participate in Gang Wars as well as Territory Wars.

=== Missions and jobs ===
While players are participating in the different combat modes, there are different tasks that they can complete in order to acquire more rewards.

==== Missions ====
Missions can be accepted by going to speak to any NPCs with an exclamation point "!" above their heads. Each mission has its own mini-story arc that the player can go through. Missions can involve acquiring items, talking to other NPCs or meeting certain requirements in battle. If the player has to go speak with another NPC in one of the lobbies, that NPC will now have a check mark above their head. Players who complete missions receive cash, experience, and sometimes items.

==== The Daily Goal ====
Players automatically are subscribed to the daily goal. The daily goal is a mini mission where the player can complete a certain requirement for rewards. Usually, the player will receive experience, cash, and a bronze coin. Bronze coins are particularly valuable due to the fact that they can be used to buy weekly tournament passes from the coin operators, as well as other rare items. Bronze coins can only be acquired through completing the daily goal.

==== Jobs ====
Jobs can be accessed by the player visiting any of the many payphones that are spread throughout the three lobbies. When clicked on, a menu appears with many different jobs that the player can select from. These jobs vary, allowing players to subscribe to jobs based on their play style. For example, a player who likes to use a shotgun is able to subscribe to jobs such as "Do X amount of damage with shotguns" or "Kill X amount of enemies with a shotgun." Rewards for completing jobs can be redeemed by revisiting a payphone once the in game notice that a job has been completed appears on the player's screen. Rewards for jobs can be cash, experience, and sometimes, items.

=== Quickplay mode ===
Some players may not want to have to deal with all of the complexity and large amount of micro managing that CrimeCraft has to offer. Players now have the option to play CrimeCraft in quickplay mode. Quickplay mode completely removes the lobby, missions, and other features in CrimeCraft to allow the player to enjoy purely the shooting aspect of the game.

==== Classes ====
To make the game even simpler, Vogster has implemented the use of pre-built classes. These classes have predetermined items that the player cannot change. Each class has been designed for a certain type of gameplay in mind, and the player is allowed to choose which class it would like to play as. Players still have the option to create their own custom loadout if they choose to do so within quickplay mode, and any pre-built classes the player bought are still usable from the normal lobby included mode. Players are able to change from quickplay mode to the full lobby mode and vice versa at any time.

=== Economy ===
Just like most other Massively Multiplayer Games, CrimeCraft has its own breathing economy. The main hub for all transactions and pricing of items is created by the players in the Auction house. Players are able to sell any unwanted items they may have for in-game cash. Sellers can set the starting bid and the amount of time the item is up for auction. The rarer an item, the more likely that a seller will price the item high. Sellers also have the ability to set a buyout price, which will allow prospective buyers to outright by the item and end the auction for a predetermined price.

Gold Bars are a special type of currency that players can only acquire by buying them with real currency. Players are able to buy packages of gold bars on the CrimeCraft website. 1 Gold Bar is usually equivalent to 5 cents USD. The larger a gold bar package that a player buys, the cheaper the price of each gold bar will be. Gold Bars can be used in a few different areas within CrimeCraft, but the main way that they are used are within the Black Market. Players can access the black market through the main menu, and have the ability to buy in game items as well as customization items for their character.

== Reception ==
CrimeCraft was heavily criticized for its business model after its initial launch. Since launch the developer, Vogster Entertainment, has changed the business model from a box purchase with subscription fee and microtransactions to an “Unlimited Free Trial” and have now settled on a more traditional Free to Play model with upgrades via subscriptions and microtransactions.

CrimeCraft was refused classification in Australia on November 30, 2009, by the Classification Board because of the game's use of drugs as incentives or rewards.

== Other titles ==
=== Kingpin ===
CrimeCraft: Kingpin is a companion product to CrimeCraft for iPhone and Facebook, designed as a social MMO in a Mafia Wars style.
