= Autodesk MotionBuilder =

3D character animation software

MotionBuilder
- Developer: Autodesk Inc.
- Stable release: 2026 / March 26, 2025; 16 months ago
- Operating system: Windows, Linux
- Type: 3D computer graphics
- License: Trialware
- Website: www.autodesk.com/products/motionbuilder/overview

MotionBuilder is a 3D character animation software produced by Autodesk. It is used for virtual cinematography, motion capture, and traditional keyframe animation. It was originally named Filmbox when it was first created by Canadian company Kaydara, later acquired by Alias and renamed to MotionBuilder. Alias in turn was acquired by Autodesk.

It is primarily used in film, games, television production, as well as other multimedia projects.

At SIGGRAPH 2012, Autodesk announced a partnership with Weta Digital and Lightstorm Entertainment to develop the next generation of the technology.

== Features ==
- Facial and skeletal animation
- Support for motion capture devices
- A software development kit that exposes functionality through Python and C++ via Qt and PySide.
- Ragdoll physics
- Inverse kinematics
- 3D non-linear editing system
- Direct connection to other Autodesk digital content creation tools
- The FBX (.fbx) file format for 3D software interoperability has grown out of this package

== See also ==
- Autodesk Maya
- Autodesk 3ds Max
- Blender (software)
