= Autodesk =

American software company

Coordinates: 38.0055°N 122.5308°W

Autodesk, Inc.
- Type: Public
- Traded as: Nasdaq: ADSK; Nasdaq-100 component; S&P 500 component
- Industry: Software
- Founded: January 30, 1982; 44 years ago, in Mill Valley, California, U.S.
- Founders: John Walker; Dan Drake
- Headquarters: One Market Plaza, San Francisco, California, U.S.
- Key people: Stacy J. Smith (chairman); Andrew Anagnost (CEO)
- Products: See § Products
- Revenue: ▲US$7.21 billion (2026)
- Operating income: ▲US$1.58 billion (2026)
- Net income: ▲US$1.12 billion (2026)
- Total assets: ▲US$12.5 billion (2026)
- Total equity: ▲US$3.05 billion (2026)
- Number of employees: 14,300 (2026)
- Website: autodesk.com
- Footnotes; Financials as of January 31, 2026.

Autodesk, Inc. is an American multinational software corporation that provides software products and services for the architecture, engineering, construction, manufacturing, media, education, and entertainment industries. Autodesk is headquartered in San Francisco, California, and has offices worldwide. Its U.S. offices are located in the states of California, Oregon, Colorado, Texas, Michigan, New Hampshire and Massachusetts. Its Canadian offices are located in the provinces of Ontario, Quebec, Alberta, and British Columbia.

The company was founded in 1982 by John Walker, who was a co-author of the first versions of AutoCAD. AutoCAD is the company's flagship computer-aided design (CAD) software and, along with its 3D design software Revit, is primarily used by architects, engineers, and structural designers to design, draft, and model buildings and other structures. Autodesk software has been used in many fields, and on projects from the One World Trade Center to Tesla electric cars.

Autodesk became best known for AutoCAD, but now develops a broad range of software for design, engineering, and entertainment—and a line of software for consumers. The manufacturing industry uses Autodesk's digital prototyping software—including Autodesk Inventor, Autodesk Fusion, and the Autodesk Product Design Suite—to visualize, simulate, and analyze real-world performance using a digital model in the design process. The company's Revit line of software for building information modeling is designed to let users explore the planning, construction, and management of a building virtually before it is built.

Autodesk's Media and Entertainment division creates software for visual effects, color grading, and editing as well as animation, game development, and design visualization. 3ds Max and Maya are both 3D animation software used in film visual effects and game development.

== History ==
The company was founded by John Walker, Daniel Drake, and 14 other programmers in April 1982, who invested $60,000. Walker founded the company after acquiring Interact, a computer-aided design program that operated on microcomputers running the 8-bit CP/M operating system and two of the new 16-bit systems, the Victor 9000 and the IBM Personal Computer (PC). This tool made it affordable for smaller design, engineering, and architecture companies to create detailed technical drawings. The program had been developed by Michael Riddle in 1979. Riddle had struggled to sell the program, and agreed to sell it to Walker in exchange for royalties. The program was further developed and renamed AutoCAD.

The cofounders were unsure of which area of technology to pursue, so founded the company first and planned as many as five different software applications to see which would succeed. Walker later said that he thought CAD was a niche field ("I mean, just compare the number of architects with the number of people that write documents"), but strong public reaction to AutoCAD at its debut at the 1982 Comdex in Las Vegas, and disinterest in the text editor that was Autodesk's other product there, caused the company to focus on CAD. AutoCAD went on sale in December 1982 and earned $1.4 million in revenue in its first year. Walker said in December 1984 that Autodesk was profitable from its first month and had not needed loans or outside investors. By then the company had about 10,000 AutoCAD systems installed; it was so successful that for a while Autodesk implied that AutoCAD was the company's name. The company continued to see itself as a general-purpose software company until new CEO Carol Bartz ended diversification outside computer-aided design in the early 1990s.

Autodesk became a public company in 1985. John Walker did not enjoy the process of writing the prospectus, relating the process to "lying on the beach or juggling chainsaws".

Release 2.1 of AutoCAD, released in 1986, included AutoLISP, a built-in Lisp programming language interpreter initially based on XLISP. This opened the door for third party developers to extend AutoCAD's functionality, to address a wide range of vertical markets, strengthening AutoCAD's market penetration.

Subsequent to AutoCAD Release 13, the company stopped supporting the Unix environment and the Apple Macintosh platform. After AutoCAD Release 14 (R13 was last DOS & Unix release), first shipped in 1997, Autodesk discontinued development under DOS, and focused exclusively on Microsoft Windows.

AutoCAD has grown to become the most widely used CAD program for 2D non-specialized applications. The native file formats written by AutoCAD, DXF and DWG, are also widely used for CAD data interoperability.

In 1989, Autodesk's sales grew to over $100,000,000 after just four operational years.

Walker remained a programmer at Autodesk until 1994, when he left due to disagreements with changes at the company. With the purchase of Softdesk in 1997, Autodesk started to develop specialty versions of AutoCAD, targeted to broad industry segments, including architecture, civil engineering, and manufacturing. Since the late 1990s, the company has added several significant non-AutoCAD-based products, including Revit, a parametric building modeling application (acquired in 2002, from Massachusetts-based Revit Technologies for $133 million), and Inventor, an internally developed parametric mechanical design CAD application.

In 2007, Timothy Vernor sued Autodesk (Vernor v. Autodesk, Inc.), alleging that he was entitled to resell "used" copies of AutoCAD software on eBay. He had obtained the software from an Autodesk licensee at an office liquidation sale. A federal district judge in Washington denied Autodesk's initial motion to dismiss in early 2008. In February and March 2009, both sides filed motions for summary judgment addressing the issue whether the First Sale Doctrine applies to previously licensed software. The Court ruled in Vernor's favor, holding that when the transfer of software to the purchaser materially resembled a sale (non-recurring price, right to perpetual possession of copy) it was, in fact, a "sale with restrictions on use" giving rise to a right to resell the copy under the first-sale doctrine. As such, Autodesk could not pursue an action for copyright infringement against Vernor, who sought to resell used versions of its software on eBay. Autodesk appealed the decision to the United States Court of Appeals for the Ninth Circuit, which reversed the lower court ruling, denying Vernor the right to resale Autodesk software due to Autodesk's nontransferable licensing restrictions. In October 2011, the U.S. Supreme Court let stand the 9th Circuit Court of Appeals ruling.

Autodesk introduced a new logo at the TED conference in Long Beach, California, on February 26, 2013.

Autodesk announced the largest lay off in its history on November 27, 2017, with the lay off of 1,150 jobs. This was in addition to the almost 1,000 job cuts announced in January 2016. The number of Autodesk employees decreased from approximately 9,200 to 7,200 in less than 2 years.

Autodesk updated to its current logo in September 2021.

In 2022, Autodesk moved its headquarters to San Francisco from San Rafael, California—which served as its headquarters since 1994.

In 2025, Autodesk layoffs of 1,350 employees roughly 9% of its workforce as part of restructuring effort to focus on AI and cloud computing.

In January 2026, Autodesk shed about 7% of its global workforce. This amounted to approximately 1000 jobs.

In February 2026, Autodesk announced its investment of $200 million in World Labs, an AI spatial intelligence company who specializes in multimodal world models. The world models developed by World Labs are able to generate realistic 3D worlds that can manipulated, simulated, reconstructed, and interacted with by both human users and AI agents. Autodesk's collaboration with World Labs aims to advance physical-world AI via technical exploration inspired by customer desires and real-world outcomes. Additionally, World Labs announced their mission to revolutionize storytelling, creativity, robotics, scientific discovery, and more using the new funding and knowledge Autodesk brings. Autodesk will serve as an advisor to World Labs with collaboration in research and world model development. According to AutoDesk News, the investment in World Labs is a deliberate choice to pursue a more human centered path when developing and using AI solutions.

=== Corporate acquisitions ===
- In 1992 Autodesk acquired Micro Engineering Solutions (MES) Inc., a developer and marketer of manufacturing CAD / CAM software.
- In 1993 Autodesk acquired Ithaca Software, a 3D computer graphics company founded by Autodesk's former CEO Carl Bass and Garry Wiegand.
- In December 1996, Autodesk announced its plan to acquire Softdesk, a developer of architecture, engineering and construction software.
- In 1998 Autodesk acquired assets of Genius CAD-Software to strengthen the functionality of its core mechanical products.
- In August 1998, Autodesk agreed to acquire Discreet Logic Inc. for about $520 million in stock.
- In 1999, Autodesk acquired VISION* Solutions, a vendor of enterprise automated mapping/facilities management/geographic information systems (AM/FM/GIS) from MCI Systemhouse Corp.
- In January 2001, Autodesk acquired Gentry Systems, a supplier of specialized software tools and services in the electric utility industry. The asset was used to strengthen Autodesk's position in the utility industry.
- In September 2001, Autodesk acquired Buzzsaw.
- In February 2002, Autodesk acquired Revit Technology Corporation, a developer of parametric building technology for building design, construction, and management.
- In August 2002, Autodesk acquired CAiCE Software Corporation, a developer of surveying and engineering applications for transportation agencies and consultants; the product was released in 2003 as "Civil 3D".
- In December 2002, Autodesk acquired the assets of truEInnovations, Inc. to create the application Autodesk Vault.
- In 2003 Autodesk acquired Linius Technologies, Inc. and purchased certain assets of a third software company—VIA Development Corporation.
- In 2004 Autodesk acquired MechSoft, Inc., the developer of the MechSoft product.
- In 2005 Autodesk acquired the assets of COMPASS systems GmbH, to strengthen Autodesk's position in the European product data management market.
- In 2006 Autodesk acquired Alias, with its automotive styling and digital content creation applications such as FBX file format.
- On August 6, 2007, Autodesk announced the acquisition of Skymatter Inc, developer of Mudbox.
- On August 9, 2007, Autodesk completed the acquisition of NavisWorks Limited.
- On August 20, 2007, Autodesk announced that it completed the acquisition of technology and product assets of Opticore AB in Gothenburg, Sweden. Opticore is specialized in real time visualization primarily for the carmakers industry.
- On August 28, 2007, Autodesk announced the acquisition of PlassoTech, developers of CAE applications.
- In January 2008, Autodesk completed the acquisition of Robobat, a France-based developer of structural engineering analysis applications.
- In February 2008, Autodesk announced that it completed the acquisition of the assets of Carmel Software Corporation.
- On May 1, 2008, Autodesk announced it agreed to acquire Moldflow Corporation, a leading provider of injection molding simulation software.
- On May 7, 2008, Autodesk announced that it completed the acquisition of Kynogon SA, the privately held maker of Kynapse artificial intelligence middleware. Paris-based Kynogon specialized in video game middleware and simulation.
- On May 7, 2008, Autodesk also announced the acquisition of REALVIZ S.A. REALVIZ's flagship products are "Stitcher" software for the creation of panoramas and 360 degree virtual tours, and "ImageModeler" software to produce 3D models from photographs.
- In June 2008, a press release announced the acquisition of Square One Research and its flagship product, Ecotect.
- In October 2008, Autodesk announced the acquisition on Avid's Softimage, Co. business, developers of 3D application Softimage (formerly Softimage|XSI).
- On December 15, 2008, Autodesk announced the acquisition of BIMWorld, plans to combine BIMWorld with Autodesk Seek.
- On December 17, 2008, Autodesk agreed to acquire ALGOR, Inc. for approximately $34 million.
- In December 2009, Autodesk announced the acquisition of VisualTAO (also known as PlanPlatform), an Israeli start-up that developed cloud-based web and mobile applications that enable users to view and edit AutoCAD files online. VisualTAO became part of PSEB, and the product was released during 2010 as "AutoCAD WS".
- In 2010, Autodesk announced the acquisition of Illuminate Labs, the maker of Beast (a global illumination middleware) and Turtle (a global illumination plugin for Maya) used for video game development.
- In February 2011, Autodesk announced the acquisition of Blue Ridge Numerics, Inc., a leading provider of simulation software.
- In March 2011, Autodesk announced the acquisition of Scaleform, a UI middleware for video games.
- In July 2011, Autodesk announced the acquisition of Pixlr, online photo editing and sharing service.
- On August 1, 2011, Autodesk announced the acquisition of Instructables, a website and platform where users can share their ideas and collaborate with a variety of do-it-yourself projects.
- On August 25, 2011, Autodesk announced the acquisition of Numenus, which optimizes CAD and construction processes by using NURBS technology.
- In November 2011, Autodesk announced the acquisition of Grip Entertainment, which develops behavior control systems for computer-controlled characters in video games.
- In December 2011, Autodesk announced the acquisition of Horizontal Systems, a provider of cloud-based BIM (Building Information Modeling) collaboration solutions for the AEC (architecture, engineering and construction) industry.
- In 2012, Autodesk announced the acquisition of Qontext, Inc., an enterprise social collaboration platform to accelerate Autodesk's ongoing move to the cloud and expansion of social capabilities in the Autodesk 360 cloud-based service.
- End 2012/Beginning 2013 Autodesk completed the acquisition of PI-VR GmbH, developer of realtime and offline visualization software VRED, heavily utilized in the automotive industry.
- On March 19, 2013, Autodesk completed the acquisition of Firehole Technologies, a developer of design and analysis software for composite materials.
- On May 18, 2013, Tinkercad announced it had been bought by Autodesk. Tinkercad is a browser-based 3D solid modeling tool for rapid prototyping known for its simple interface and entry-level ease of use.
- In October 2013, Autodesk signed an agreement to acquire structural fabrication and detailing software- Advance Steel from Graitec.
- In February 2014, Autodesk completed the acquisition of Delcam, a UK based supplier of advanced CAD/CAM software for the manufacturing industry.
- In March 2014, Creative Market announced it had been bought by Autodesk. Creative Market is a platform for handcrafted, mousemade design content from independent creatives around the world.
- In May 2014, Autodesk acquired Nei Nastran, one of three versions of Nastran, the FEA solver.
- In May 2014, Autodesk acquired Within Technologies, a company founded by Siavash Haroun Mahdavi.
- In June 2014, Shotgun Software announced that it had been acquired by Autodesk. Shotgun Software are the publishers of the popular "Shotgun" project tracking software for media and entertainment content creation.
- In July 2014, Autodesk acquired Topolabs Technology, a company founded by James Page which pioneered the use of 3D toolpaths for FDM/FFF additive manufacturing systems.
- In August 2015, Autodesk signs agreement to acquire SeeControl.
- In April 2016, Autodesk announced that it had acquired SolidAngle, creator of the Arnold rendering software.
- In June 2016, Autodesk acquired CadSoft Computer GmbH, creator of the PCB design software EAGLE, from Premier Farnell.
- In July 2018, Autodesk announced that it had acquired Assemble Systems.
- In November 2018, Autodesk announced that it would acquire PlanGrid, a San Francisco-based provider of construction productivity software.
- In December 2018, Autodesk announced that it would acquire BuildingConnected, a San Francisco-based construction bid-management platform.
- In April 2020, Autodesk announced that it had invested in Aurigo Software to Bolster Construction Technology Offering for Owners. Aurigo provides a full lifecycle cloud software to plan, design, build and operate construction assets.
- On July 14, 2020, Bridgit Inc. announced that Autodesk had raised $9.4 million in venture capital to take an ownership stake in the Canadian company which makes Bridgit Bench, an online construction work force and resource planning software.
- On July 22, 2020, Autodesk announced that it would acquire Pype, a Bengaluru-based provider of cloud-based solutions for automating construction project management workflows.
- In November 2020, Autodesk announced that it would acquire Spacemaker, a cloud-based platform that uses artificial intelligence (AI) and generative design to rapidly create, optimize, iterate, and evaluate design alternatives for buildings.
- In February 2021, Autodesk announced that it would acquire Innovyze, a provider of smart water infrastructure modeling and simulation technology, for $1 billion.
- In December 2021, Autodesk announced that it would acquire ProEst, a cloud-based construction estimating product.
- In January 2024, Autodesk announced that it would acquire Payapps, a cloud-based construction claim software.
- In May 2024, Autodesk announced that it had acquired Wonder Dynamics, a cloud-based 3D animation and VFX tools founded by actor and producer Tye Sheridan.
- In August 2024, Autodesk announced that it had acquired key intellectual property from Golaem, as well as its team. Golaem was a French software vendor specialized in crowd simulation, its main product was a plug-in for Maya.

== Products ==
=== Platforms ===
A screenshot of AutoCAD (2006), Autodesk's flagship product

The Platform Solutions and Emerging Business (PSEB) division develops and manages the product foundation for most Autodesk offerings across multiple markets, including Autodesk's flagship product AutoCAD, AutoCAD LT, AutoCAD for Mac, and the AutoCAD mobile app (formerly AutoCAD 360). Autodesk Suites, Subscription and Web Services, which include Autodesk Cloud, Autodesk Labs, and Global Engineering are also part of PSEB. In what was seen as an unusual step for a maker of high-end business software, Autodesk began offering AutoCAD LT 2012 for Mac through the App Store. Also part of PSEB is the Autodesk Consumer Product Group, which was created in November 2010 to generate interest in 3D design. Users range from children, students and artists to makers and DIYers.

=== Training and certification ===
Autodesk offers certificates in two categories: Autodesk Certified User and Advanced Certified Professional.

- Autodesk Certified User – Verifies entry-level skills in key Autodesk products. Designed for students and instructors who wish to demonstrate basic proficiency. Curriculum, courseware, and exams offered for independent study or institutional integration.
- Advanced Certified Professional – Validates more advanced skills, including complex workflow and design challenges. Designed for students seeking a competitive advantage in a specific product area.

=== Architecture, engineering and construction ===
The Architecture, Engineering and Construction (AEC) industry group is headquartered in Boston, Massachusetts, in a LEED Platinum building designed and built using Autodesk software. Autodesk's architecture, engineering, and construction solutions include AutoCAD, and Revit, which is its flagship product for relational Building information modeling. The AEC division also develops and manages software for the Construction industry, including Autodesk Forma (formerly Autodesk Construction Cloud), Advance Steel, and the Navisworks (formerly JetStream) product tools; the Infrastructure industry, including Civil 3D, and InfraWorks; and the MEP industry, including Fabrication CADmep. The Autodesk Services Marketplace offering helps its clients train their team in AEC Industry. Projects that have used software from the Autodesk AEC division include the NASA Ames building, the San Francisco Bay Bridge, the Shanghai Tower, and New York's One World Trade Center.

=== Genetic engineering ===
Autodesk Life Sciences is an extensible toolkit for genetic engineering. It visualises DNA code (Molecule Viewer), and has a tool for writing DNA code (genetic constructor). The tool allows work on molecule-level, rather than nucleobase-level (A, C, G, T) constructs.

In 2018, all projects were suspended.

=== Manufacturing ===
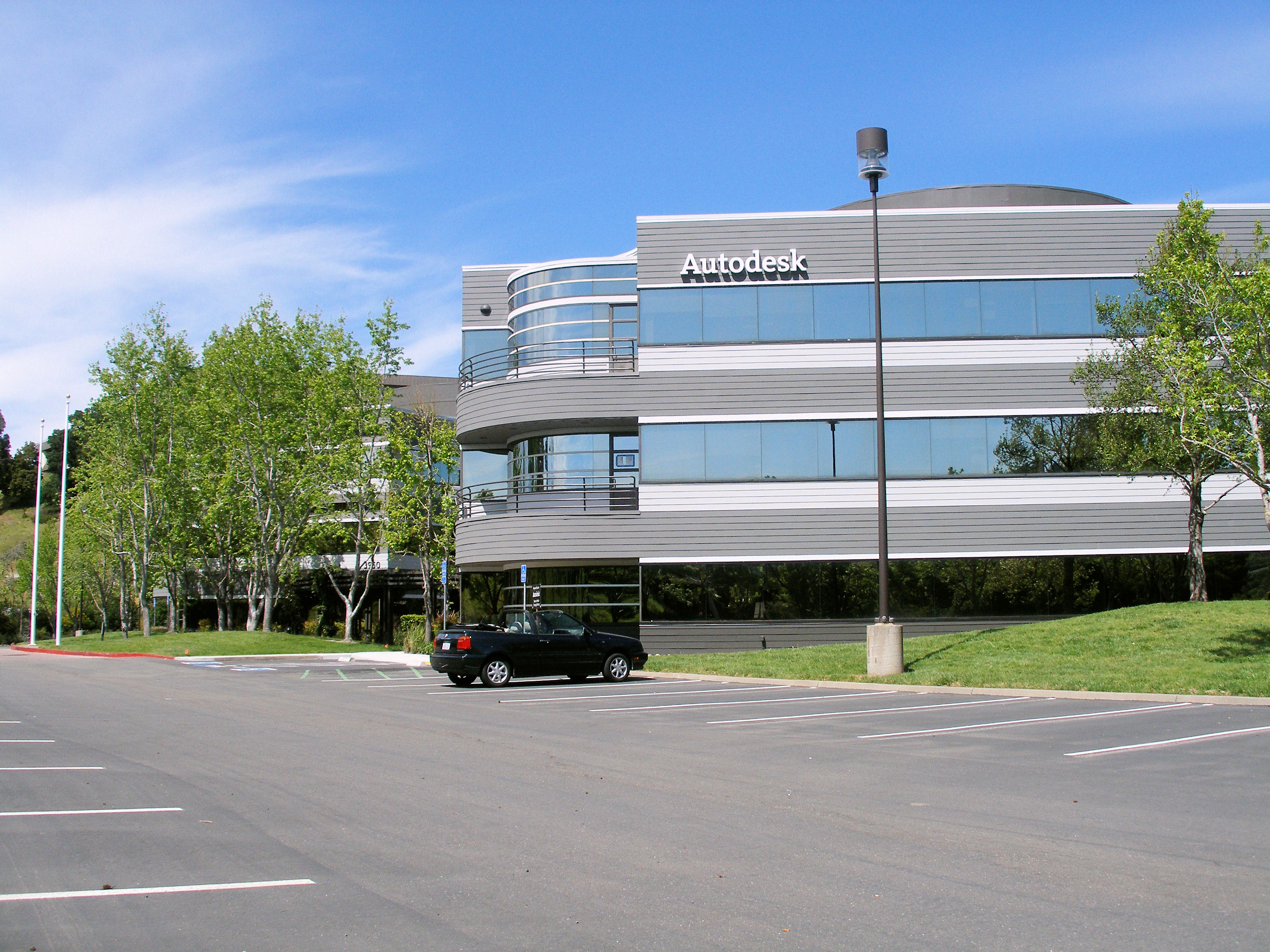
Former Autodesk headquarters in San Rafael

Autodesk's manufacturing industry group is headquartered in Portland, Oregon. The company's manufacturing software is used in various manufacturing segments, including industrial machinery, electro-mechanical, tool and die, industrial equipment, automotive components, and consumer products. The principal products are Autodesk Fusion, and its family (Fusion with FeatureCAM, PowerMill, PowerShape, PowerInspect, or Netfabb), Autodesk Alias, Autodesk Inventor, Autodesk Vault, Autodesk CFD (formerly Autodesk Simulation CFD), Moldflow, VRED, and the Product Design & Manufacturing Collection, which includes Inventor Nastran (formerly Nastran In-CAD), Inventor CAM (formerly Autodesk HSM and Inventor HSM), Inventor Nesting, Inventor Tolerance Analysis, and Factory Design Utilities.

=== Media and entertainment ===
Autodesk Media and Entertainment products are designed for digital media creation, management, and delivery, from film and television visual effects, color grading, and editing to animation, game development, and design visualization. Autodesk's Media and Entertainment Division is based in Montreal, Quebec. It was established in 1999 after Autodesk, Inc. acquired Discreet Logic, Inc. and merged its operations with Kinetix. In January 2006, Autodesk acquired Alias, a developer of 3D graphics technology. In October 2008, Autodesk acquired the Softimage brand from Avid. The principal product offerings from the Media and Entertainment Division are Flame, Flow Production Tracking, Autodesk Flow Studio (formerly Wonder Studio), and the Media & Entertainment Collection, which include Maya, 3ds Max, Arnold, MotionBuilder, Golaem, and ReCap Pro.

Much of Avatar's visual effects were created with Autodesk media and entertainment software. Autodesk software enabled Avatar director James Cameron to aim a camera at actors wearing motion-capture suits in a studio and see them as characters in the fictional world of Pandora in the film. Autodesk software also played a role in the visual effects of Alice in Wonderland, The Curious Case of Benjamin Button, Harry Potter and the Deathly Hallows – Part 1, Inception, Iron Man 2, King Kong, Gladiator, Titanic, and other films. Walt Disney Animation Studios also utilizes Autodesk Maya for character rigging and animation, being used in films such as Frozen II.

=== Renderers ===
Autodesk develops and purchased many specific-purpose renderers but many Autodesk products had been bundled with third-party renderers such as NVIDIA Mental Ray or Iray.

- Autodesk Raytracer (ART; aka RapidRT) –- a simple path tracing renderer based on Opticore technology.
  - Autodesk Real Time Ray Tracing (Autodesk RTRT; formerly Opus RTRT) - a ray tracing rendering engine used in Autodesk Opticore Studio and Autodesk Real-Time Ray Tracing Cluster
- Autodesk VRED – an OpenGL/Raytracing real-time and offline renderer that supports direct NURBS ray tracing
- Autodesk Arnold – a CPU- or GPU-accelerated pathtracing renderer widely used in animation and visual effects for film and TV
- Turtle – a primary texture-baking renderer in Maya LT; its baking technology was also used in Beast, a discontinued lighting middleware with baking tools.
- Maya Software – a scanline/raytracing hybrid renderer in Maya
- 3ds Max Scanline – a scanline/ray tracing/radiosity hybrid renderer in 3ds Max
- Maya Vector – a vector renderer based on Electric Rain's RAViX technology.
- One Graphics System – a GPU photorealistic/non-photorealistic renderer, aka Nitrous/Quicksilver in 3ds Max and Viewport 2.0/Hardware 2.0 in Maya
  - Maya Hardware – a legacy GPU rasterize renderer in Maya 2017 or earlier.

==== Cloud rendering services ====
- Autodesk Rendering (formerly A360 Rendering) – a simple cloud renderer
- 3ds Max Cloud Rendering – a technology preview cloud rendering system for Arnold on 3ds Max.
- Azure Batch Rendering – a cloud rendering system for Maya, 3ds Max and Arnold, which is provided by Autodesk and Microsoft.

==== Visualization tools ====
- Autodesk VRED (formerly PI-VR VRED)
- 3ds Max Interactive – a real-time visualization tool based on Autodesk Stingray, shipped within 3ds Max.

=== Discontinued products ===
Some of Autodesk's end of life products are listed here:

Autodesk End of Life Water Products

- InfoAsset Manager
- InfoAsset Online
- InfoAsset Mobile
- InfoWorks ICM Live
- InfoWorks IW Live
- Lightscape 3.2 - radiosity rendering package
- Volo View - web-enabled review and markup tool for engineering data
- Autodesk Animator Pro (DOS) and Autodesk Animator Studio (Windows) - cel-based animation software
- Cyberspace - real-time 3D environment
- CAD Camera
- AutoSketch
- AutoShade
- AutoCAD Survey (Autodesk Survey)
- Civil Design
- AutoCAD Civil 3D Land Desktop Companion (AutoCAD Land Desktop)
- Autodesk Mechanical Desktop
- AutoCAD Freestyle, released on April 26, 2010, and discontinued January 31, 2011.
- Autodesk Fluid FX
- Autodesk Time FX
- Inventor Fusion was discontinued August 23, 2014, due to redundancies with Fusion 360.
- Sketchbook designer has been discontinued as of November 1, 2012
- Autodesk Softimage, a 3D computer graphics software, was discontinued after the release of Softimage 2015 on April 14, 2014.
  - Face Robot
  - Lagoa Multiphysics
- Autodesk Stitcher Unlimited
- Autodesk ImageModeler
- Autodesk Movimento (formerly Realviz Movimento)
- Autodesk Combustion
  - Discreet Effect (formerly Illuminaire Composition)
  - Discreet Paint (formerly Illuminaire Paint)
- Cleaner Streaming Studio
  - Cleaner Live
  - Cleaner
  - Cinestream (formerly EditDV)
- 3D software for game modification
  - gmax
  - Maya PLE
  - XSI Mod Tool
- Autodesk Topobase Client – its feature was merged into AutoCAD Map 3D.
- Autodesk Topobase Web – its feature was merged into Autodesk Infrastructure Map Server.
- Autodesk Opticore Realizer (formerly Opus Realizer)
- Autodesk Opticore Studio (formerly Opus Studio)
- Autodesk AutoCAD ecscad – the product was replaced by AutoCAD Electrical.
- Autodesk Smoke Advanced
- Autodesk Flint
- Autodesk Inferno
- AutoCAD Structural Detailing
- tsElements for SolidWorks
- FBX Converter
- FBX QuickTime Viewer
- Autodesk Scaleform Unity Integration
- Revit variants
  - Autodesk Revit Architecture – its features were merged into Revit itself.
  - Autodesk Revit Structure – its features were merged into Revit itself.
  - Autodesk Revit MEP – its features were merged into Revit itself.
- Autodesk Ecotect Analysis
- Buzzsaw – the service was replaced by BIM 360 Docs.
- Mockup 360 – the tool was replaced by A360 Viewer.
- Autodesk Remote
- Inventor Engineer-to-Order
- Autodesk Advance Concrete
- Autodesk Quantity Takeoff – some features of the product were merged into Autodesk Navisworks Simulate.
- Autodesk 123D
  - Autodesk 3D Print Utility – its features were merged into the Meshmixer.
  - Autodesk 123D CNC Utility
  - Autodesk 123D Sculpt+ (formerly 123D Sculpt and Sculpt 123D)
  - Autodesk 123D Make – its slice feature was introduced in "Slicer for Fusion 360" add-in.
  - Autodesk 123D Catch (formerly Project Photofly)
  - Autodesk 123D Circuits (a.k.a. Circuits.io) – its "Electronics Lab" feature was merged into Tinkercad.
- Tinkerplay (formerly Modio)
- Autodesk plugins for Rhino
  - Autodesk T-Splines Plug-in for Rhino
  - Autodesk Shape Modeling Plug-in for Rhino (formerly VSR Shape Modeling)
  - Autodesk Realtime Renderer (formerly VSR Realtime Renderer)
- Autodesk ForceEffect family
  - Autodesk ForceEffect
  - Autodesk ForceEffectMotion
  - Autodesk ForceEffectFlow
- Autodesk Spark – the 3D Print API in Autodesk Forge was also discontinued.
- Print Studio – the tool was replaced by Netfabb.
- Autodesk Footwear CAM Software (formerly Delcam Crispin)
- Autodesk Delcam for Solidworks CAM Software
- Autodesk Delcam Dentmill CAM Software
- Autodesk Delcam Orthomill CAM Software
- Autodesk Artcam CAM Software
- Autodesk Partmaker CAM Software
- Autodesk Inventor Publisher – the product was replaced by the presentation feature of Autodesk Inventor Professional.
  - Inventor Publisher Viewer
- AutoCAD Utility Design
- Pixlr for Desktop
- Autodesk Showcase
  - Autodesk Real-Time Ray Tracing Cluster
- Autodesk Simulation Mechanical
- Autodesk Homestyler
- Autodesk Within – its functionality was merged into Netfabb.
- Autodesk ReMake – the product was replaced by ReCap Photo in ReCap Pro.
- Autodesk Gameware
  - Autodesk Scaleform
  - Autodesk Beast
  - Autodesk HumanIK
  - Autodesk Navigation (the successor of Autodesk Kynapse)
  - Autodesk Population
  - Autodesk Cognition
- Lagoa
- Autodesk Stingray (formerly Bitsquid) – the product is now part of 3ds Max as "3ds Max Interactive".
- Autodesk Infrastructure Map Server (formerly Autodesk MapGuide Enterprise Server)
- Autodesk Live Viewer – The presentation published by Autodesk Live (Revit Live) now comes with internal viewer but its mobile publishing feature was dropped.
- Autodesk Flow Design
- AutoCAD variants
  - AutoCAD P&ID – the product was replaced by AutoCAD Plant 3D.
  - AutoCAD Architecture (formerly Autodesk Architectural Desktop) – the product was merged into AutoCAD itself.
  - AutoCAD Electrical – the product was merged into AutoCAD itself.
  - AutoCAD Mechanical – the product was merged into AutoCAD itself.
  - AutoCAD MEP (formerly Autodesk Building Systems) – the product was merged into AutoCAD itself.
  - AutoCAD Map 3D – the product was merged into AutoCAD itself.
  - AutoCAD Plant 3D – the product was merged into AutoCAD itself.
  - AutoCAD Raster Design – the product was merged into AutoCAD itself.
- Structural Analysis for Revit – the product was replaced by Robot Structural Analysis Professional.
- A360 Desktop
- Autodesk InfraWorks 360 iPad app
- Autodesk MatchMover (formerly RealViz MatchMover)
- Autodesk Composite (formerly Autodesk Toxik)
- BIM 360 Team (formerly A360 Team)
  - P&ID Modeler for Revit – deprecated to expand the use of the product.
  - Collaboration for Plant 3D (C4P) – deprecated to expand the use of the product.
- Autodesk Revit Extensions
- Autodesk TruFiber – the product was merged into TruComposites.
- Autodesk TruLaser – the product was merged into TruComposites.
- Autodesk TruPlan – the product was merged into TruComposites.
- Autodesk Life Sciences' products
  - Genetic Constructor
  - Molecule Viewer
- Configurator 360
- Alias SpeedForm – its functionality was merged into other Alias products.
- Alias Design
- Revit Live
- Revit Model Review – the product was replaced by Autodesk BIM Interoperability Tools.
- Site Designer add-in for Revit
- ReCap Pro for mobile
- Slicer for Fusion 360
- A360 Drive – the product was replaced by Autodesk Drive.
- Autodesk Constructware
- Inventor LT
  - Inventor LT Suite
- Dynamo Studio – the product was replaced by Dynamo Sandbox.
- Autodesk TruComposites
- Autodesk TruNest
- Autodesk Meshmixer – though it's still available as free, the development was discontinued; its technologies were merged into Fusion 360 and Netfabb.
- Netfabb Online Service – the product was merged into Fusion 360.
- Autodesk 3ds Max Asset Library
- Autodesk Smoke – the product was replaced by Flame Assist.
- Autodesk Maya LT – the product was replaced by Maya Creative.
- Autodesk Screencast
- Autodesk EAGLE – the technology was merged into Fusion 360.
- Autodesk Process Analysis 360
- Chaos: The Software, part of the "Science Series"
- RenderGin (formerly Augenblick MMV) – realtime NURBS ray tracing renderer that was merged into VRED.
- Autodesk Realtime Renderer (formerly VSR Realtime Renderer) – ray tracing renderer for Rhinoceros 3D.
- Lightscape – radiosity renderer merged into Autodesk VIZ (later 3ds Max Design).
- Lagoa MultiOptics – cloud renderer for visualization
- Autodesk ImageStudio (formerly Alias ImageStudio) – visualization tool based on mental ray, marketed for Autodesk Alias
- Autodesk Showcase – design visualization tool
- Autodesk Opticore Studio (formerly Opus Studio) – design visualization tool
- Revit Live – real-time visualization service for Autodesk Revit
- FormIt Pro
  - FormIt for Windows
  - FormIt for iPad
  - FormIt Web
- Autodesk Lustre (formerly Colossus)
- HSMWorks
- BIM 360 Plan (a.k.a. BIM 360 classic)
- BIM 360 Glue
- Autodesk Fusion Signal Integrity Extension
- Autodesk Mudbox

=== Maintenance-mode products ===
- PlanGrid - the product was replaced by Autodesk Construction Cloud.
- BIM 360 - the product was replaced by Autodesk Construction Cloud.
  - BIM 360 Field (formerly Vela Systems) – the product had become to provide through BIM 360 Build.
  - BIM 360 Build – the product was replaced by Autodesk Build.
  - BIM 360 Coordinate (formerly BIM 360 Glue) – the product was replaced by BIM Collaborate which is a subset of Autodesk BIM Collaborate Pro (formerly BIM 360 Design).

=== Non-maintained products ===
- Motion FX

=== Formerly owned and have since been divested ===
- Autodesk Seek – acquired by BIMobject AB.
- Autodesk Pixlr – acquired by 123RF.
- Creative Market – became independent again in funding by Palm Drive Capital and others.
- Autodesk SketchBook (formerly Alias Sketchbook Pro) – became independent

== Sustainability ==
Autodesk CFD (formerly Autodesk Simulation CFD) includes modeling and thermal modeling tools for architectural and MEP applications. Common applications for environmental sustainable design include mechanical ventilation, external flow (wind loading), natural ventilation, and occupant comfort. Other energy applications include analysis for building energy, solar load, advanced energy and heating and cooling. Autodesk introduced C-FACT, an open-source, science-driven approach to setting greenhouse gas reduction targets, which calls for greenhouse gas (GHG) reductions to be made in proportion to a company's gross domestic product (GDP). Unlike other carbon accounting methods, Autodesk's C-FACT measures carbon dioxide emissions that are proportional to a company's global GDP contribution. Autodesk will derive its own targets using this approach through 2020.

In 2006, Autodesk sponsored a PBS program named e² Design, which focused on green building design around the world, describing the leaders and technologies that drive sustainable design.

In November 2021, the company was added to the Dow Jones Sustainability World Index.

== See also ==
- Digital prototyping
