= Softimage =

Softimage may refer to:

- Autodesk Softimage, discontinued 3D graphics software, then known as Softimage XSI
- Softimage (company), a defunct Canadian software company
- Softimage 3D, discontinued 3D graphics software
