= Char Davies =

Canadian contemporary artist

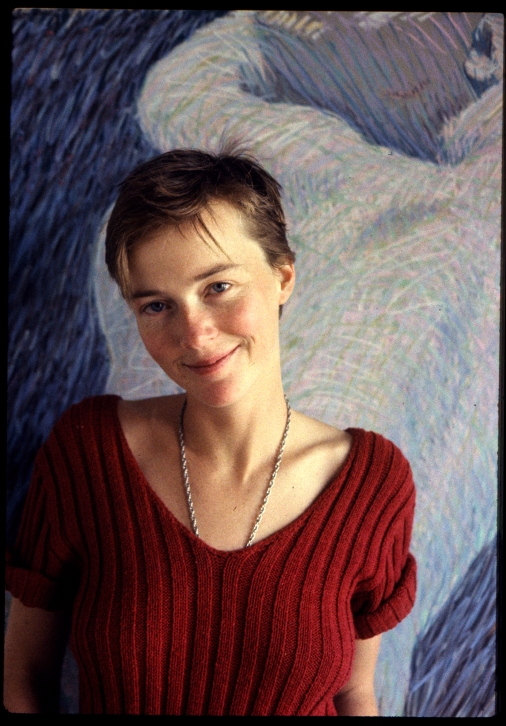
- Born: Charlotte Adèle Davies; 1954 (age 71–72); Toronto, Ontario, Canada
- Education: Bennington College, 1973-1975 University of Victoria, BFA, 1978
- Notable work: Osmose, 1995 Éphémère, 1998
- Style: Immersive Virtual Reality

Char Davies (born 1954) is a Canadian contemporary artist known for creating immersive virtual reality (VR) artworks. A founding director of Softimage, Co, she is considered a world leader in the field of virtual reality and a pioneer of bio-feedback VR. Davies is based in rural Quebec and San Francisco.

== Early life and education ==
Davies was born in Toronto, Ontario, Canada. She studied liberal arts at Bennington College in Vermont, focusing on philosophy, religion, anthropology and biology for three years from 1973 to 1975. She transferred to the University of Victoria (UVic) and received the Bachelor of Fine Arts degree in 1978. After leaving UVic, she made a living for a while painting portraits of loggers and trees on Vancouver Island. The experience of watching the loggers - who mostly enjoyed nature - destroy things they loved had a profound influence on her own later work.

In 2005, Davies earned a doctorate from Plymouth University for her PhD dissertation about the "philosophical underpinnings of her own art practice".

== Career ==
=== Early digital work ===
Since Davies was originally a painter, her early forays into virtual art were characterized by a "painterly style." Her own style developed her own created symbolic language and sense of aesthetics. As early as the 1980s, Davies was looking into computer technology and 3D virtual spaces. In 1983, she was inspired by computer animations, and felt that computer art might help her capture images that could go beyond painting.

Her Interior Body Series (1990–1993) was a collection of 3D still images, exploring the possibilities of how art can be viewed in virtual space. The Interior Body Series was shown internationally and won an Ars Electronica Distinction in 1994.

Davies is a scuba diver, and some of her underwater experiences have influenced her art. Much of her inspiration for creating VR work like Osmose came from a time when she and fellow divers were waiting to encounter sharks. While in the water, she felt that she could "slip into an altered state of consciousness."

=== Virtual reality art ===
Davies is one of the first artists to use virtual reality as a means of artistic expression. In 1993, Davies began exploring the medium as an arena for art that questions our habitual perceptions about nature and "being", and affirms our embodiment in the world. Davies feels that virtual reality can be used to "examine our perceptions of the world" and allow people to have philosophical experiences within the virtual space. Virtual reality is also a way for Davies to extend the concept of art, where a two-dimensional painting is able to be extended through technology into a three-dimensional space which can be explored and invite interaction. Visual components of the VR space are created not through traditional methods, but rather by algorithms and transparency maps; it is the unique and creative way that Davies combines customized programming that make her work unique. Davies emphasizes that it is important to understand that her work is dependent on the team who help her bring her digital art to life. She also stresses that her work also has deep connections to her beginnings as a painter, especially in regards to her sense of color.

Davies created an immersive virtual environment in Osmose (1995), integrating 3D visual elements and spatially localized sound with interaction based on breath and balance. It was first exhibited in Montreal in 1995 at the Sixth International Symposium on Electronic Art (ISEA). Osmose challenged an "immersant's" (Davies' preferred term for viewer) notions of space and explored the "porous borders between lived experience and virtual experience." Osmose had a Cartesian 3D grid that the immersant would be able to travel through and "visit" twelve different world-spaces based on "metaphorical aspects of nature." An immersant entered the world of Osmose by wearing a Division head-mounted display and breath was measured though Polhemus motion sensors. The world is generated by an SGI Supercomputer. Breathing itself became the "motor" for the immersant to move through the virtual environment. Breathing out causes the immersant to feel as if they are sinking and breathing in causes them to have the sensation of floating up. Leaning one way or another gently causes the immersant to change direction. This biofeedback method of navigating Osmose was developed because Davies wanted to "reaffirm the priority of 'being in the world' compared with 'doing' things in it or to it." Davies spent many years researching light and space before creating Osmose. Davies had some help to realize her vision for Osmose: John Harrison to create the VR subsystem and Georges Mauro to create the models and textures for the virtual objects. Mauro worked from references provided by Davies' art. Overall, Davies emphasized that the "creative process was exploitative, improvisational, and intuitive."

Osmose was followed by Ephémère in 1998, expanding on the concept of the virtual world as art, and adding temporal elements (day/night cycles) to the piece. Davies describes both works, saying, "I see [them] as a means of return, i.e., of facilitating a temporary release from our habitual perceptions and culturally-biased assumptions about being in the world, to enable us, however momentarily, to perceive ourselves and the world around us freshly." Ephémère allows the immersant to go inside of objects and see them from the inside-out. As immersants interact with the world, they cause things to happen by gazing at objects like seeds, which causes them to grow.

== Software development ==
Davies was a founding director of the 3D CG software company Softimage, its first vice-president (1988–1994) and director of visual research (1994–1997).

In 1998, she founded Immersence, Inc. to develop and share software for the creation of 3D virtual environments. Immersence, Inc. is also a "vehicle for pursuing her artistic research."

== Recognition ==
In 2002, her alma mater the University of Victoria awarded Davies an Honorary Doctorate of Fine Arts for her contributions to the field of media art.
