= Polhemus =

Polhemus may refer to:

- Gianni Polhemus, American road bike racer
- Gretchen Polhemus (born 1965), former Miss USA and second runner-up to Miss Universe 1989
- John T. Polhemus (1929–2013), American entomologist
- Mark Polhemus (1860–1923), Major League Baseball player
- Ted Polhemus (born 1947), American anthropologist, writer, and photographer who lives and works on England's south coast

== See also ==
- James S. Polhemus House, house in southeast Portland, Oregon listed on the National Register of Historic Places
- Polhemus & Coffin, New York-based architectural firm formed by Henry M. Polhemus and Lewis Augustus Coffin
- Polhemus Memorial Clinic in Brooklyn, New York, built in 1897 as an extension of a hospital for the poor
