= Softimage (company) =

Canadian software company (1986–2008)

Coordinates: 45.5131°N 73.5715°W

Softimage, Co.
- Formerly: Microsoft Softimage (1994–1998); Avid Softimage (1998–2008)
- Type: Subsidiary
- Industry: Software
- Founded: 1986; 40 years ago
- Founders: Daniel Langlois
- Defunct: October 23, 2008
- Fate: Brand and 3D assets acquired by Autodesk; Other assets continued to be owned by Avid
- Headquarters: Montreal, Quebec, Canada
- Products: Softimage|3D; Softimage|XSI; Softimage|DS; Softimage|Eddie; Softimage|FaceRobot
- Parent: Microsoft (1994–1998); Avid Technology (1998–2008)

Softimage, Co. (/ˌsɒftɪˈmɑːʒ/) was a Canadian 3D animation software company located in Montreal, Quebec. A subsidiary of Microsoft in the 1990s, it was sold to Avid Technology, who would eventually sell the name and assets of Softimage's 3D-animation business to Autodesk.

Its first product, Softimage 3D, was used in the creation of special effects for movies such as Jurassic Park, Terminator 2, Titanic and The Fifth Element. Its successor, Softimage XSI, was used in the production of the Academy Award-winning feature film Happy Feet, 300 and Charlotte's Web (2006) and the production of games such as Konami's Metal Gear Solid 4: Guns of the Patriots.

In 1997, the Academy of Motion Picture Arts and Sciences awarded Softimage a Scientific and Engineering Award for the development of the "Actor" component of Softimage|3D.

During the Microsoft years, Softimage also developed a non-linear video-editing and compositing suite named Softimage|DS, which was available from Avid Technology under the name Avid DS, until its EOL on September 30, 2013.

== History ==
Softimage was founded in 1986 by National Film Board of Canada filmmaker Daniel Langlois. He was joined in 1988 by founding director, Char Davies, a Virtual Reality artist who became vice-president of Virtual Research. At the time, there were only three employees. Its first product was called the Softimage Creative Environment, later renamed to Softimage 3D. It was the first commercial package to feature Inverse kinematics for character animation. The software was eventually replaced by SoftimageXSI, originally codenamed "Sumatra".

In 1991, Director of sales Richard Szalwinski left to found Discreet and re-distribute Animal Logic's image compositor Eddie. Eddie would be acquired by Softimage from Discreet in 1992 and renamed Softimage|Eddie.

The company went public in 1992 and was acquired by Microsoft in 1994 for US$130 million.

Dominique Boisvert, Réjean Gagné, Daniel Langlois, and Richard Laperrière won a Scientific and Engineering Award for the development of the 'Actor' component of the Softimage computer animation system

In 1998, after helping to port the products to Windows and financing the development of Softimage|XSI and Softimage|DS, Microsoft sold the Softimage unit to Avid Technology, Inc. which was looking to expand its visual effect capabilities.

Avid initially grouped many of its visual effects products, such as Elastic Reality and Avid Media Illusion, under the Softimage brand, but in 2001 discontinued most of these products. Until 2008, Avid's AlienBrain product was also branded with the name Softimage, even though it was developed by a separate company. During this time, in 2000, Softimage acquired The Motion Factory, Inc.

On October 23, 2008, Autodesk signed an agreement with Avid Technology to acquire the brand and the 3D animation assets of Softimage for approximately $35 million, thereby ending Softimage Co. as a distinct entity. The video-related assets of Softimage, including Softimage|DS (now Avid|DS) continue to be owned by Avid.

Softimage products were made in Quebec. Softimage is mentioned in the song "Fabriqué au Québec" written by the Québécois humorists Pat Groulx and Louis-José Houde.

== Products ==
=== Softimage|3D ===
Screenshot of Softimage|3D 3.9.2

Originally named Softimage Creative Environment, this was the first product developed by Softimage. Softimage President Daniel Langlois and engineers Richard Mercille and Laurent Lauzon begin development of the company's 3-D application software in 1987. The user interface would remain largely unchanged for the next 16 years of the product's life. In a first for the industry, the software offered modeling, animation and rendering in a single integrated environment.

Creative Environment 1.0 was introduced at SIGGRAPH in 1988 and the first public release, v0.8, was followed shortly by v1.0 all in 1988. The next year v1.65 was released including texture mapping followed in 1990 by v2.0 with a set of new animation tools, the concept of object constraints, a new Dopesheet editor, and spline modeling.

The software received a major update in 1991 with the release of v2.5 which included an Actor Module with Inverse Kinematics, a concept coming from robotics. The Actor Module also included Bones, Flexible Skin (Envelopes), and Rigid-Articulated Body Dynamics. Softimage received a Technological and Scientific Academy Award for the module's innovation after it was employed in Terminator 2: Judgment Day (which itself won the Academy Award for Best Visual FX).

Additional updates followed in 1992 with v2.52 which included the addition of Motion Capture (Channels) and an SDK (DKit) and in 1993 with v2.6 which introduced a wide variety of features including Metaclay ("Metaballs"), Motion Control, Clusters, Shape Animation, mental ray rendering, Wave Deforms, Flock Animation (macro particles), a Standalone Particle System, Rotoscopy, 3D Booleans and Ghost display/Onion skinning. Mental ray rendering was made possible by a rendering technology agreement between Softimage and mental images announced the same year.

Along with Microsoft's acquisition of Softimage in 1994, the company released v2.65 which introduced revamped File and Database Management, a new Topological scene graph update, Structure Keys, Extended Constraints, Expressions, Animation par Shapes, and Toon rendering.

The Interactive Developer's Entertainment Authoring Software (IDEAS) with ProPlay and ProPlay Plus solutions was introduced in 1994 and included Softimage Creative Environment, Eddie compositing, video-effects software, distributed ray tracer and a 3-D particles kit.

The 1995 release of v3.0 was the first major release in which the product was named Softimage|3D and the same year, the company released the first version of its Softimage|3D Extreme edition which included Osmose, Virtual Theater (real time capture and virtual set compositing) and mental ray. Version 3.0 included NURBS Surfaces and Modeling (Trims, Instances and Relational modeling), Qstretch deform (squash and stretch), Custom hotkey remapping (swift keys), a Spreadsheet function, the 1st generation of Polygon Reduction, as well as Games Features (Advanced polygonal modeling tools, 2D/3D Paint + UV Texturing + Painterly Effects, Color Reduction, and Game Export / filtering / on target viewing for SEGA Saturn).

Version 3.5 was released in 1996 and included Windows NT support, User Data, an Image Library, Ambulate, Stepmaler, and the Saaphire SDK. It was followed in 1997 by v3.7 which expanded the Game Export functionality to include Sony PlayStation Export / Import / Viewer + Attribute Editors and also added Colors at Vertices (painting, OpenGL, Softimage + mr rendering, Saaphire), Direct3D Export / Import, and RenderMap (baking light maps).

In 1998, v3.8 brought a GDK (Game Development Kit / high-level AP), dotXSI file format, import/export pipeline (Direct 3D, VRML, 3D Studio) and the GameFilter, Merge, Polygon Reduction, Neural Quantizer (color reduction), Animation Sequencer (precursor to animation mixing), and Audio Track for lip synch features. This was followed a year later by v3.8 Service Pack 2 which included Advanced Rendering (Caustics support, Global Illumination), Bézier curves support, Surface Continuity Manager (SCM), Drop & Slide Points, and GoWithThe Flow (which constrains objects to particles) plus additional games toolkits: Nintendo NIFF toolkit and Sony PlayStation HMD. Softimage|3D v3.9 was released in 2000 and v4.0 was unveiled in 2001 at SIGGRAPH and released in 2002.

=== Softimage|DS ===
In 1993, Softimage began developing what was initially known as Softimage Digital Studio on the Silicon Graphics IRIX (SGI) operating system. Digital Studio was a hardware/software integrated solution which was sold as a turn-key system including pre-installed software and a hardware workstation. The first Windows NT prototype of the product, under the new name Softimage|DS, was released in 1996 followed in 1997 by its 1.0 release on the Intergraph TDZ workstation and in 1998 with v2.1.

Following Autodesk's 2008 purchase of all of the Softimage 3D business assets and the Softimage brand from Avid, Softimage|DS was rebranded Avid|DS. Avid continued to sell the solution until 2013.

=== Softimage|XSI ===
The software which would become Softimage|XSI was unveiled in 1996 under the code name Sumatra along with RenderFarm, a Sumatra module which was never released. In 1997, a company announcement mentioned Twister, a rendering module of Sumatra. Twister was officially announced at SIGGRAPH in 1998 as the first module of the still-unreleased Sumatra. However, Twister was later canceled to allow the company to focus on Sumatra.

The 1999 campaign "Animation R3defined" was the presentation of Sumatra as the first "Non-Linear 3D animation" system The Animation Mixer, which allows manipulation of animation as clips on tracks, similar to video non-linear editing system like Avid Media Composer.

Softimage|XSI finally had its v1.0 release in 2000 and included new generation architecture, user interface, workflow, etc. as well as ActiveScripting, Interactive Rendering (Render Region), Rendering Passes, Render Tree, GAP (Generic Attribute Painting), Surface meshes (Nurbs networks), Non-linear animation – Animation Mixer, and Integrated Particles features. The 1.0 release was followed later the same year with v1.5 which added Polygonal modeling, Subdivision Surfaces, and texturing tools as well as Animation Clip Effects/Offsets, Equalizer, Bridge Transitions, Scripted Operators (scripted plugins), Soft-Bodies, Cloth, Fluids (from Phoenix Tools), and the SDK Object Model (COM). While v1.5 was released in 2000, it didn't start shipping until 2001. In the same year at SIGGRAPH the company announced Softimage|XSI v2.0 which introduced a fully integrated compositor, based on Avid Media Illusion, and a Hair and Fur module, based on Joe Alter's Shave. Version 2.0 which was released later that year also brought with it support for Linux (previously, supported unix was SGI IRIX) and Electric Rain collaborate to bring Flash, EPS, AI and SVG exports to SOFTIMAGE|XSI customers.

The company released the SOFTIMAGE|XSI Experience for v2.0 in 2002. This was a free educational software and training kit. Alias had previously released a Personal Learning Edition of Maya, a Softimage competitor. Also in 2002, Softimage released Softimage|XSI v3.0 which was an evolutionary update but introduced Softimage|Behavior, a procedural animation system, marketed as a new Crowd Simulation engine. This was a re-branded version of a product called Motivate developed by Softimage's 2000 acquisition, The Motion Factory.

Softimage released version 3.5 of Softimage|XSI in 2003 which updated Softimage|Behavior to version 1.1 and also brought back the Schematic View from Softimage|3D.

In 2004, v4.0 was released which included new Rigid Body Dynamics based on ODE, Character SDK, Custom Display Host, XML-based UI definition, new XGS real time shader pipeline, a new Vector and Raster Paint tool in the compositing module and shipped with Syflex. Version 4.2 was released later that same year. Version 5.0, released in 2005, was the first Windows 64-bit version and added new user interface elements to appeal to Autodesk Maya users as well as Integrated Cloth with Syflex 3, Updated Rigid Body Dynamics with physX, a new view: Shape Manager, for morph shape animation, and dotXSI 5.0.

There were two releases of Softimage|XSI in 2006: v5.1 which added Autodesk 3DS Max compatible keymap and GATOR plug-in for 3DS Max plus Collada import/export, and v6.0 with a focus on animation tools, animation layers, and a motion transfer tool ("MOTOR"), several new views including Material Manager, Material Panel and Animation Layer Manager as well as the Elastic Reality morpher in the compositor and Delta Referencing. These releases were followed in 2007 with v6.5 which was mostly a release to adjust price and re-shuffle features between the software's two editions: XSI Essential and XSI Advanced.

The final release under Avid ownership and the final release using the product name Softimage|XSI was v7.0 which introduced ICE ("Interactive Creative Environment"). Later in the year, Autodesk acquired all Softimage 3D business assets from Avid and Softimage ceased to exist as an entity.

Autodesk Media and Entertainment continued to develop the Softimage|XSI product, re-branded as Autodesk Softimage.

=== Softimage|FaceRobot ===
Softimage|FaceRobot was introduced in 2006. Following Autodesk's acquisition of all Softimage 3D business assets from Avid in 2008, FaceRobot was rebranded Autodesk FaceRobot.

=== Packages and libraries ===
==== Softimage|Eddie ====
Eddie was a paint and compositing package co-developed and co-owned by Discreet and Animal Logic. It was acquired by Softimage in 1992 and renamed Softimage|Eddie. In 1994, Softimage|Eddie was included in Softimage's IDEAS bundle along with Softimage|3D and a number of related packages and tools. Version 3.2 was released in 1995.

==== Other packages and libraries ====
- SI Live Virtual Theater was first released at NAB in 1995
- Painterly Effects was an image processing library acquired by Softimage in 1992 from ImageWare Research
- Softimage Toonz, originally named Creative Toonz was a 2-D animation package which automated the more tedious tasks involved in 2-D cel animation, such as inking-&-painting, while still maintaining the look of hand-drawn images and characters. The package was introduced by Softimage in 1993 and v3.5 was released in 1995.

== Select works ==
Softimage software was used to produce visual effects for a wide variety of films and video games.

=== Film ===
Year	Title	Studio	Awards	Ref(s)
1991	Terminator 2: Judgment Day	Industrial Light & Magic	Academy Award for Best Visual Effects	
1992	Death Becomes Her	Industrial Light & Magic	Academy Award for Best Visual Effects	
1993	Jurassic Park	Industrial Light & Magic	Academy Award for Best Visual Effects	
1994	Star Trek Generations	Industrial Light & Magic		
1994	The Flintstones	Industrial Light & Magic		
1994	The Mask	Industrial Light & Magic	Academy Award for Best Visual Effects Nominee	
1995	Casper	Industrial Light & Magic		
1995	Babe	Rhythm & Hues Studios	Academy Award for Best Visual Effects	
1995	Balto	Amblimation		
1995	Judge Dredd	Mass.Illusion		
1995	Jumanji	Industrial Light & Magic		
1995	La Cité des enfants perdus	BUF Compagnie		
1996	Independence Day		Academy Award for Best Visual Effects	
1996	101 Dalmatians	Industrial Light & Magic		
1996	12 Monkeys	Peerless Camera		
1996	Space Jam	Industrial Light & Magic		
1996	Star Trek: First Contact	Industrial Light & Magic		
1996	The Adventures of Pinocchio	MediaLab		
1996	Surviving Picasso	Peerless Camera		
1996	Dragonheart	Industrial Light & Magic		
1996	Eraser	Mass.Illusion		
1996	Joe's Apartment	Blue Sky Studios		
1996	The Island of Dr. Moreau	Digital Domain		
1996	The Frighteners	Weta Digital		
1996	Mission: Impossible	Industrial Light & Magic		
1996	Mars Attacks!	Industrial Light & Magic		
1996	T2-3D: Battle Across Time	Digital Domain		
1997	Titanic	Digital Domain	Academy Award for Best Visual Effects	
1997	Starship Troopers	Tippett Studio		
1997	Alien Resurrection	Amalgamated Dynamics		
1997	Spawn	Industrial Light & Magic		
1997	Anastasia	Fox Animation Studio		
1997	Batman & Robin	BUF Compagnie		
1997	Contact	Sony Pictures Imageworks; Weta Digital		
1997	Men in Black	Industrial Light & Magic		
1997	The Lost World: Jurassic Park	Industrial Light & Magic		
1997	The Fifth Element	Digital Domain		
1997	Speed 2: Cruise Control	Industrial Light & Magic		
1997	Flubber	Industrial Light & Magic		
1998	Saving Private Ryan	Industrial Light & Magic		
1999	The Mummy	Industrial Light & Magic		
1999	The Matrix	Mass.Illusion	Academy Award for Best Visual Effects	
1999	Stuart Little	Centropolis FX		
1999	Fight Club	Pixel Liberation Front; BUF		

=== Video games ===
Year	Title	Studio	Notes	Ref(s)
1996	Virtua Fighter 3	Sega AM2		
1996	DragonHeart: Fire & Steel	Funcom		
1997	Colony Wars	Psygnosis		
1997	Formula 1 97	Psygnosis		
1997	Shadow Master	Psygnosis		
1997	Riven	Cyan		
1997	Resident Evil 1.5	Capcom	Beta of Resident Evil 2	
1998	Psybadek	Psygnosis		
1998	Rascal	Psygnosis		

== See also ==
- Autodesk Softimage, formerly Softimage|XSI
- Softimage 3D
- Avid DS, formerly Softimage|DS
- Ex-Centris
