= Avid Media Illusion =

Avid Media Illusion was a digital nonlinear compositing software by Avid Technology targeted at the film and television markets. It ran on Silicon Graphics workstations. The main features were paint, compositing, image manipulation and special effects.

== History ==
Illusion was originally developed by Parallax Software under the name "Advance". Avid later bought Parallax, and renamed "Advance" to "Media Illusion". The software was discontinued on December 6, 2001, officially due to lack of resources to support it any further.

Media Illusion was targeted at the high-end SGI post production market, which was at the time dominated by Discreet Flame.

In 2001, Softimage, a division of Avid, introduced a new image compositing module in its 3D animation product Softimage XSI 2.0 which is based on Media Illusion 6.0. The product offers and augments many of the essential image compositing features of Media Illusion on Windows and Linux, but does not offer the video digitizing and playback support, and the OMFI media integration and editing which helped Media Illusion make its place in high end broadcast. The compositing module integrated in XSI 6.0 (2000 USD) targets RGBA file-based desktop compositing for the 3D artist.

== Features ==
Media Illusion featured distributed rendering using multiple CPUs. Several specialized plug-ins were available from Sapphire, The Foundry, Primatte and Ultimatte, among others.

== Development ==
=== Release history ===
Version	Hardware	O/S	Release date	Price	Significant changes (selected)
Media Illusion 4.0	?	IRIX	1997	?	?
Media Illusion 4.5	O2 and Octane	IRIX	1998	$24,800 for O2, $31,000 for Octane	?
Media Illusion 6	?	IRIX	December 6, 1999	$24,800	Improved keying; Improved process tree; Improved stabilizing and tracking; New animation and graph editors; Improved support for HDTV and 16:9
Media Illusion 6.1v8	O2, Octane, Onyx 2	IRIX	2001	$24,800	?

== See also ==
- Avid Elastic Reality
- Avid Matador
- Softimage XSI
- Avid Technology
