= Avid Elastic Reality =

3D animation software

Avid Elastic Reality setup with SGI Octane and WACOM graphics tablet

Elastic Reality was a warping and morphing software application available on Windows, Macintosh, and Silicon Graphics workstations and was discontinued in 1999.

== Features ==
The workflow of the application is based around drawing source and destination curves or shapes onto an image using Bézier curve tools. The software then automatically generates an animated distortion of the image, commonly called a warp. If the warp is used to blend two images together, the effect is called morphing. Elastic Reality made its name with the ease of use of its tool, and the quality of the resulting warps. Other warping tools have typically offered a simpler warping and morphing based on animating points on a grid, which can require significantly more work from the artist to animate distortion of organic shapes such as human faces.

The application also featured basic color correction and image compositing tools, as well as the ability to keyframe the motion of Bézier shapes in groups and onto motion paths, and could be used for motion graphics effects not typically associated with morphing. The application supported 8-bit and 16-bit images, and image sequences.

== History ==
Several members of the Elastic Reality team including three original members, one almost original member, and one member who came later

The product was originally created by ASDG of Madison, Wisconsin, which renamed itself Elastic Reality Inc, in 1994, following the success of its product. The company was acquired by Avid Technology in March 1995. The product was rebranded Softimage Elastic Reality after Avid separately acquired Softimage in 1998.

Before 1994, ASDG had started on the Amiga, and produced an image processing application called Art Department Professional (ADPro), and in 1992 a precursor to Elastic Reality called MorphPlus. Other software products included Image Independence (graphic file conversion and scaling), ASDG Abekas driver, Lightning F/X (for lightning effects (Later called Avid LFX)) and NSA (No Strings Attached) for removing wires from live action effects.

As early as 1994, Elastic Reality for SGI, (written by Paul Miller at ASDG in collaboration with Ted Fay at VisionArt) became the de facto morphing system in the film and broadcast industry, and contributed to hundreds of feature films and television effects, including The Iron Giant, Star Trek: Deep Space Nine, Independence Day, The Mask, and Batman Forever.

In literature, Elastic Reality was notably used by illustrator David B. Mattingly to create the original covers for the Animorphs series.

Along with Gryphon Software Morph, Elastic Reality continues to be used in the present day on old computers maintained for the purpose of running Elastic Reality.

In 1997, Avid made the core image warping engine available in the form of one morphing and one image warping effect in Avid Media Illusion 5.0. These effects were integrated one year later in Avid|DS's image compositing module. The newest product to make these available is Softimage|XSI v6.0, released in December 2006, which features an integrated 2D image compositing module that is derived from Avid Media Illusion 6.0.

Compared to the classic Elastic Reality application, these effects use the 2D shape, user interface and other features native to these products, and the interaction is different, although the results can be the same. For example, in Avid Media Illusion and XSI 6.0, morphs can be performed with B-spline curves and polygonal lines, can process 16-bit images, and offer an interactive OpenGL preview of the warp. The classic Elastic Reality application offered only Bezier curve, 8-bit image processing, and a wireframe preview which required a rendering step for accurate preview. In Avid DS, the built-in 2D tracker can be used to procedurally animate the shapes. In all three host applications, the effects are offered as image operators inside an image compositing tree, and do not require launching a separate application which makes it easier to use in conjunction with other tools. On the other hand, the classic Elastic Reality application featured items like shape grouping which could be used for matting or complex intersection groups, a path tracing tool, and more seldom used motion graphics tools to constrain and animate shapes on a path and edit keyframes. Avid DS features equivalent animation tools in its "Graphics" module, and standard tools in these host applications can be used to mask and combine image warping effects, often in ways more powerful than the classic Elastic Reality application offered.

== Awards ==
Perry Kivolowitz and Garth Dickie received a 1996 Technical Achievement Award from the Academy of Motion Picture Arts and Sciences for the invention of shape-based warping and morphing embodied in Elastic Reality. This award recognizes that all shape-based warping and morphing systems descend from this innovation.

== Development ==
=== Release history ===
Version	Company	Hardware	O/S	Release date	Price	Comments / Significant changes (selected)
MorphPlus	ASDG Inc.	Amiga	Amiga OS	1992	$49	
Elastic Reality 1.0	ASDG Inc.		Mac OS	1993	$995, promo $345	
Elastic Reality 1.0	ASDG Inc.		Windows	August 1994	$495	1st Windows release. Comes with a transition generator (stand-alone) called TransJammer. Byte "Best of Comdex" award at COMDEX. Similar to SGI version 1.3 plus some compositing features of the SGI 2.0 release
Elastic Reality 2.0	Elastic Reality Inc.		SGI IRIX	October 1994	$5,000	Additional compositing tools not found in the Mac version (multiple matte types and composite stages). Regional color-correction and matte boolean operations.
Elastic Reality 3.0	Avid Technology Inc.		SGI IRIX	1996	$3,000	
Elastic Reality 3.0	Avid Technology Inc.		Windows	April 7, 1997	$999, $495, $299	
Elastic Reality 3.0	Avid Technology Inc.		Mac OS	July 3, 1997	$999, $495, $299	

== See also ==
- Avid Matador
- Avid Media Illusion
- Avid Technology
- Perry Kivolowitz
