= Perry Kivolowitz =

American computer scientist

- Born: 1961 (age 64–65)
- Known for: Recoverable RAM drive; Shape-driven warping and morphing; Elastic Reality software; SilhouetteFX
- Awards: Academy Award for Scientific and Technical Achievement (1996); Engineering Emmy Award (2019)
- Scientific career
- Fields: Computer science; Computer graphics; Digital imaging
- Institutions: Advanced Systems Design Group / Elastic Reality, Inc.; Avid Technology; SilhouetteFX; Carthage College; University of Wisconsin–Madison

Perry Kivolowitz (born 1961) is an American computer scientist and special effect designer.

Kivolowitz was born in New York City. He is a professor of Computer Science at Carthage College in Kenosha, Wisconsin. He has also taught at UW-Madison.

In 1992, he won an Emmy certificate for his work on Babylon 5.

In 1997, he received an Academy Award for Scientific and Technical Achievement for the invention of shape-driven warping and morphing as exemplified in the Avid Elastic Reality. This software was used in Forrest Gump (1994), Titanic (1997) and "every film nominated for best special effects since 1993," Kivolotitz said in 2000.

He is also the creator of rotoscoping software SilhouetteFX that has been used in editing feature films including Christopher Robin, Solo: A Star Wars Story and Avengers: Infinity War and received a Technical Achievement Certificate from the Academy of Motion Picture Arts and Sciences in 2018.

In 2019, SilhouetteFX won an Engineering Emmy Award.
