= Alan Dunning =

Alan Dunning is a Canadian artist based in Calgary, Alberta.

Since the eighties, he has produced monumental installations accompanied by artist books addressing the mutability of meaning and intertextuality. The late nineties marked a turning point for Dunning when he began in-depth research into immersive environments in virtual reality. "Since 1987, Dunning has been using a computer to gather an impressive bank of images and texts that he then disseminates according to parameters determined randomly. His installations revisit the "all-over" strategy in a conceptual form and often occupy a gallery's entire wall surface. Visitors simultaneously perceive the singularity of the details and the overall effect produced by their display. Yet the excess signifiers do not negate the narrative structure woven between all the elements".

The cycle of installations in The Einstein's Brain Project (1995–2001) is a major technological shift for Dunning that, nonetheless, re-examines his past conceptual concerns. In this project, beginning in 1995 with Paul Woodrow and a team of scientists from different fields, Dunning probes the new epistemological models that have developed thanks to technological advances in virtual reality. Currently, Dunning is working on a project with working title (WIW), Worlds in Worlds. Dunning plans to put together an immersive environment whose boundaries will be defined by the real dimensions of the room the participant is in. Dunning's interest in an Anatomically Lifelike Biological Interface, which operates via a model reproducing certain bio-anatomical functions, is leading him to pursue research on the properties of ferrofluids, liquid matter that can be altered by an electromagnetic field and modified by biological signals from the human body.

In 2002 the Daniel Langlois Foundation supported "Representations of the Body in Liquid Media Spaces", Alan Dunning's "technical and conceptual research into developing an interface prototype that places the human body in a discursive and media space without relinquishing the body's materiality".

Recent exhibitions have included: ACM Multimedia2005, Singapore, aniGama, Novosibirsk State Art Museum, Novosibirsk, Russia, Kitchener-Waterloo Art Gallery, Kitchener, Ontario, multimediale, Prague, Czech Republic, 404 Festival of Electronic Art, Rosario, Argentina, Ciber@rt, Bilbao, Spain, and Art Boat, Art Chicago 2004, Computer Art Congress 2008, Toluca & Mexico City, Mexico.

Dunning teaches at the Alberta University of the Arts.
