= Avid Matador =

Avid Matador setup with SGI Octane and WACOM graphics tablet

Matador (meaning killer in Spanish) was a paint application targeted at the television and film production markets. Running on Silicon Graphics workstations, its main features were paint, mask creation/rotoscoping, animation, and image stabilization/tracking.

Matador was originally developed by Gareth Griffith, Chris Steele, Dominic Jackson and Andrew Ballingall of Parallax Software in the UK beginning in 1989. Adopted by production studios and visual effects houses such as Industrial Light & Magic, Digital Domain, Sony Pictures and many others, Matador was used on hundreds of feature films throughout the 1990s and early 2000s, including Jurassic Park, Forrest Gump, and The Mask. In 1995, Parallax Software was acquired by Avid Technology, which continued to market Matador into the early 2000s, eventually incorporating its functionality into Softimage and Media Illusion.

== Feature List ==
Matador 7.55 running on a Silicon Graphics computer

Paint: Resolution-independent 2D paint system supporting 64-bit color depth. Customizeable pressure-sensitive brushes, cloning, image filters, layers, vector shapes, color correction, 2D and 3D text, and macros.

Masking/Rotoscoping: Chromakey masking via luminance/chroma/component/hue, multi-layered rotoscoping with animatable rotosplines and automatic traveling mattes.

Animation: Keyframeable animation of all functions, hierarchical animation with unlimited layers and in-betweening, realtime linetest.

Stabilization/Tracking: Motion tracking using up to 256 reference points; image stabilization tools.

== Release History ==
Version	Hardware	O/S	Release date	Price	Significant changes (selected)
Matador 7.0	?	IRIX	September 12, 1996	?	New painting tools; Enhanced handling of shapes and text; Support for additional file formats; Unlimited paint layers within the animation module
Matador 7.55	?	IRIX	December 6, 1999	$10,000	?

== Credits ==
=== Feature films ===
- 1992: Death Becomes Her
- 1993: Jurassic Park, The Fugitive, Cliffhanger, In the Line of Fire, Last Action Hero, Schindler's List
- 1994: Forrest Gump, The Mask, True Lies, Interview with the Vampire, Speed, Clear and Present Danger, The Crow, Star Trek Generations
- 1995: Babe, Apollo 13, Braveheart, Jumanji, Casper, Batman Forever, Waterworld, Tales from the Hood
- 1996: Independence Day, Twister, Dragonheart, Star Trek: First Contact, Mars Attacks!, Mission: Impossible
- 1997: Titanic, Men in Black, The Fifth Element, The Lost World: Jurassic Park, Contact, Starship Troopers, Batman & Robin, Dante's Peak, Flubber
- 1998: What Dreams May Come, Armageddon, Mighty Joe Young, The Avengers, Lost in Space, Saving Private Ryan
- 1999: The Matrix, Stuart Little, Star Wars: Episode I – The Phantom Menace, The Mummy, Snow Falling on Cedars, Sleepy Hollow
- 2000: Gladiator, The Perfect Storm, Hollow Man, Cast Away, Crouching Tiger, Hidden Dragon, X-Men
- 2001: The Lord of the Rings: The Fellowship of the Ring, Pearl Harbor, A.I. Artificial Intelligence, Amélie, Lara Croft: Tomb Raider
- 2002: Star Wars: Episode II – Attack of the Clones, Men in Black II, Minority Report, Spider-Man, Harry Potter and the Chamber of Secrets
- 2003: Hulk

=== Television ===
- Nestlé Coffee Crisp advertisement
- Carl's Jr. Dennis Rodman advertisement
- CBC News
- Time Team, in which it is used extensively for virtual reconstructions of buildings and landscapes.

== See also ==
- Avid Elastic Reality
- Avid Media Illusion
- Avid Technology
