= VeggieTales =

American Christian animation

- Logo used since 2014
- Created by: Phil Vischer; Mike Nawrocki
- Original work: VeggieTales (1993 video series)
- Owners: Big Idea Entertainment (IP holder); DreamWorks Classics (under NBCUniversal/Universal Pictures)
- Years: 1993–present

Print publications
- Books: Main article: List of VeggieTales books
- Comics: VeggieTales SuperComics

Films and television
- Films: Jonah: A VeggieTales Movie (2002); The Pirates Who Don't Do Anything: A VeggieTales Movie (2008)
- Animated series: VeggieTales (1993–2015); Larryboy: The Cartoon Adventures (2002–03); VeggieTales on TV! (2006–09); VeggieTales in the House (2014–16); VeggieTales in the City (2017); The VeggieTales Show (2019–22)
- Television specials: VeggieTales Christmas Spectacular (1998–2000); The Star of Christmas (2002)
- Direct-to-video: Main article: List of VeggieTales videos

Games
- Video games: The Mystery of Veggie Island (September 3, 2002); Veggie Carnival (October 15, 2002); Jonah: A VeggieTales Game (October 15, 2002); VeggieTales Creativity City (February 4, 2003); Minnesota Cuke and the Coconut Apes (September 30, 2003); VeggieTales Super Silly Fun! (December 15, 2005); VeggieTales Dance Dance Dance (December 2006); LarryBoy and the Bad Apple (August 1, 2006); "Step-by-Story presents: The Goofy Gift" (December 28, 2011); "VeggieTales Spotisodes Collection" (February 7, 2012); "Step-by-Story presents: Larry's Missing Music" (March 19, 2012)

Audio
- Soundtracks: Main article: List of VeggieTales albums
- Original music: Main article: List of VeggieTales albums

Official website
- https://www.veggietales.com

VeggieTales is an American Christian CGI-animated series and multimedia franchise created by Phil Vischer and Mike Nawrocki under Big Idea Entertainment. The series stars Bob the Tomato and Larry the Cucumber leading a variety of anthropomorphic vegetables as they retell stories from the Bible and parody pop culture while also teaching life lessons according to a biblical world view.

One of the earliest computer animated franchises, it was first released in 1993 on VHS, as a direct-to-video series, and later on DVD and Blu-ray through to 2015. The success of the videos led to multiple spin-off television series, such as VeggieTales on TV!, which ran on NBC from 2006 to 2009, two Netflix series that debuted in 2014 and 2017, and a series produced by Trinity Broadcasting Network in 2019. Two films were released: Jonah: A VeggieTales Movie (2002) and The Pirates Who Don't Do Anything: A VeggieTales Movie (2008). The success of the animations helped establish a franchise of related media, including books, music, stage productions, and video games.

The series has sold over 16 million books, 7 million music CDs, and 235 million music streams.

== History ==
VeggieTales logo used from 2009 to 2014

VeggieTales was created by Phil Vischer and Mike Nawrocki through the production company Big Idea Entertainment with an overall aim to convey Christian moral themes and teach Biblical values and lessons for a child-based audience. Vischer developed the idea for VeggieTales in the early 1990s while testing animation software as a medium for children's videos. Due to limitations in the Softimage 3D at the time, Vischer opted to avoid the technical production hurdle of designing characters with arms, legs, hair, and clothes. The first animation model for VeggieTales was an anthropomorphic candy bar. Further inspiration derived from Vischer's wife, Lisa, who suggested parents of the target audience might prefer a character who promoted healthier eating habits. Vischer then began to design the characters based on fruits and vegetables.

While most of the VeggieTales characters ended up being voiced by Vischer and Nawrocki, they also cast their friends and family to do voices in the early episodes. Dan Anderson (Dad Asparagus) and Jim Poole (Scooter) who collaborated with Vischer on dramas at their local church, were recruited for the cast. Vischer's wife also joined the cast as Junior Asparagus, which he was averse to, initially. For the series' music, Vischer brought in Kurt Heinecke, who was the music director of his church at the time. The series' earlier animators included young college graduates Chris Olsen and Robert Ellis alongside Vischer. First offered in the direct-to-video market, the first release was the 30-minute video, Where's God When I'm S-Scared?, in December 1993. Softimage 3D was used to animate the characters for episodes until 1999 when it was replaced with the new animation software, Alias Maya.

In January 2002, HIT Entertainment sued Big Idea, claiming Big Idea "abruptly walked away" from a 1997 deal with Lyrick Studios, which HIT acquired in 2001. The deal intended for HIT to manufacture and distribute VeggieTales merchandise. Having had no written contract with either Lyrick or HIT, Big Idea arranged a distribution deal with Warner Home Video, triggering the suit. In April 2003, a jury in Texas ruled Big Idea must pay $11 million to HIT—a decision which was overturned on appeal in 2005. Due to bankruptcy concerns from the jury decision, Vischer lost control over VeggieTales in 2004. Big Idea continued to produce the VeggieTales home video series until 2015.

On June 29, 2021, Vischer stated in a series of posts on his Twitter account that his wife, Nawrocki and Heinecke had left Big Idea, who intended to recast the voices for their respective characters. He also stated that Nawrocki and Heinecke had been let go from the series several years beforehand for budgetary reasons, being demoted solely to freelance work. They had asked to have a bigger role in the franchise following their involvement in The VeggieTales Show and the company refused, resulting in their complete departure.

== Characters ==
The VeggieTales episodes are teleplays performed by the various vegetables and produce that reside on a kitchen countertop. Most of these characters have "real names", and take on various roles in the teleplays. Most of these "series regulars", such as Bob, Larry, Junior Asparagus, Laura Carrot, Archibald Asparagus, Pa Grape, and Jimmy and Jerry Gourd were established in the earliest videos.

== Video series ==
=== Show format ===
The videos generally present a moral idea or ethical issue in the opening countertop segment, either through a viewer question or a conflict brought up by Bob or Larry. Usually, this is followed by one or more "films" performed by the VeggieTales characters that teach a lesson addressing said issue, with Silly Songs with Larry in the middle.

Silly Songs are generally introduced with a title card and a voice-over saying, "And now it's time for Silly Songs with Larry, the part of the show where Larry comes out and sings a silly song." Some Silly Songs have alternate titles, such as "Love Songs with Mr. Lunt", or "Ukulele Karaoke with Bob", where another character sings the song instead. The Silly Song, if one appears, is usually in the middle of the program, often at a cliffhanger moment or in between two stories (although the LarryBoy videos, in particular, often lack this segment).

At the end, there is a closing countertop segment where Bob and Larry discuss the lesson and receive a Bible verse from Qwerty the Computer to provide a biblical reference for the viewer. This is concluded with the program's signature sign-off: "Remember kids, God made you special and He loves you very much."

=== Re-issues and re-releases ===
Big Idea has released a few "special edition" DVDs which consist of remastered videos and additional features not on the original DVD.

1. Lyle the Kindly Viking Special Edition (also includes 3–2–1 Penguins! Trouble on Planet Wait-Your-Turn){{
2. King George and the Ducky Special Edition (also includes 3–2–1 Penguins! Runaway Pride at Lightstation Kilowatt)
3. Where's God When I'm S-Scared? 15th Anniversary Collector's Edition (also includes 3–2–1 Penguins! Trouble on Planet Wait-Your-Turn)

=== Compilation videos ===
Various VeggieTales videos were bundled into collections. The collections ranged in size from double features to a boxed collection of the first 30 VeggieTales videos. Compilation videos of only the Silly Songs were also released. Several video collections have the songs in "sing along" format and The Ultimate Silly Song Countdown video included the most popular Silly Songs as voted by fans of the show.

== Television ==
=== VeggieTales on TV! (2006–2009) ===
For three seasons, VeggieTales on TV! ran on NBC, Telemundo, and Ion Television as part of the Qubo children's programming block from 2006 to 2009. The television show altered the general format by opening at the front gate of Bob the Tomato's house. Bob, Larry the Cucumber, and other Veggie characters then sing the show's theme song as they hop to Bob's front door. The theme song ends with Pa Grape making a random comment on Archibald's new sweater. Bob and Larry then wait for the mailman, Jimmy Gourd, to deliver a letter. When Jimmy comes, he happily sings his Mail Song, which either Bob, Larry or both find tedious at times. Similar to the opening countertop sequence of the VeggieTales videos, either Bob, Larry or both read the letter and the cast tries to decide how to solve the viewer's problem through one of three regular segments: Archibald reads a story from his Big Book of Oddities, Pa Grape shows an old film, or Mr. Lunt appears with his stick puppet (Paco the Storytelling Mule) and tells a story. The result always proves disastrous, as the story or film makes no sense. Bob and Larry then intervene with a story from a VeggieTales video. The show ends with Bob and Larry wrapping things up by reiterating the story's lesson and Bob thanking the kids for coming over to his house. NBC episodes often end with characters bidding the audience a simple "Good-bye".

According to the Los Angeles Times, "VeggieTales has been very successful for NBC in a Saturday morning time slot that has traditionally been difficult for the networks". NBC saw its biggest ratings jump in Saturday morning children's programming since 2003." As a result, ratings on NBC's Saturday morning program had grown from an average Nielsen Rating of 0.5 between 2003 and 2005 to an average of 0.95 between 2006 and 2008, with an average of 430,000 children watching each weekend.

After NBC aired the first few episodes of the first season in September 2006, the company chose to edit the episodes to remove religious messages, including references to God. The original sign-off message—"And remember kids, God made you special and He loves you very much! Good-bye!"—was replaced by "Thanks for coming to my house today, kids. See you next week! Good-bye!". The changes were made at the request of the network's standards and practices department to enforce compliance with network policies regarding religious neutrality. The original dialogue remained viewable by users of the network's closed-caption feature.

The conservative watch group Parents Television Council complained to NBC about the changes. L. Brent Bozell, president of the group, complained of the network "ripping the heart and soul out of a successful product". His argument was that if NBC was concerned about references to God, they should not have taken the series. Bozell stated the changes "document[ed] the disconnect between Hollywood and the real world."

The response from NBC stated the editing now conformed to the network's broadcast standards, which direct producers "not to advocate any one religious point of view." NBC spokeswoman Rebecca Marks said "Our goal is to reach as broad an audience as possible with these positive messages while being careful not to advocate any one religious point of view."

Vischer expressed disappointment with these edits, stating that he was not informed that religious content would be removed from the series, and that he could have refused to sign a contract with Qubo if he had known of the decision beforehand. He said, "I would have declined partly because I knew a lot of fans would feel like it was a sellout or it was done for money." Still, Vischer said he understood NBC's wish to remain religiously neutral, and he said, "VeggieTales is religious, NBC is not. I want to focus people more on 'Isn't it cool that Bob and Larry are on television."

=== In The House and In the City (2014–2017) ===
A new series, VeggieTales in the House, premiered on Netflix as an original series in Thanksgiving 2014. The series lead is Doug TenNapel and features a theme song by independent studio musician and frequent TenNapel collaborator Terry Scott Taylor. The deal between current VeggieTales owner DreamWorks Animation and Netflix calls for the release of 75 episodes over a three-year period with each episode featuring two 11-minute stories.

Nawrocki and Vischer continue to voice their characters, but the rest of the original video cast has been replaced by veteran voice actors Tress MacNeille and Rob Paulsen. The series is an expansion of the kitchen counter top segments of the original videos to include a full city which the characters live in. Bob and Larry live as roommates in an apartment on the kitchen counter. Several stories revolve around a general store built into an adjacent kitchen island which is run by Pa Grape. The cast of characters from the original videos remains the same aside from the absence of Mr. Nezzer, who has been replaced by a similar looking character named Ichabeezer (voiced by Paulsen). Themes in each episode relate to Biblical principles such as forgiveness, compassion and generosity.

In 2017, VeggieTales in the House ended, and a new series was developed, to continue VeggieTales on Netflix. The series was called VeggieTales in the City.

=== The VeggieTales Show (2019–2022) ===
In March 2019, it was announced that the Trinity Broadcasting Network was to inherit the broadcasting rights to air a new VeggieTales series on their networks. Vischer confirmed via Twitter, he and Nawrocki were to return as full-time staff to work on the series, tentatively titled The VeggieTales Show.

On April 24, 2019, the VeggieTales YouTube channel published a video which provided information about The VeggieTales Show. The show started airing on TBN in 2019. This version of the show focuses on the VeggieTales characters acting in on shows of Bible stories in a theater. The series brought back Mr. Nezzer (albeit with voice actor David Mann), as the owner of the theater in which the show takes place. The first episode was a Christmas special called The Best Christmas Gift. This premiered on TBN Christmas Day 2019 and was distributed on DVD and Digital by Universal Pictures Home Entertainment.

In 2019, Yippee TV became the exclusive streaming service of The VeggieTales Show and released new episodes monthly from 2019 to 2022. The series has since been added to the streaming services Minno and Pureflix, though Yippee TV continues to feature more episodes than any other platform.

== Films ==
Mr. Lunt, Pa Grape, and Larry the Cucumber at the Celebrate Freedom 2007 concert

=== Jonah: A VeggieTales Movie (2002) ===
Archibald Asparagus stars as Jonah in this version of the Biblical story. The Veggies learn that God is a God of second chances, and that we need to give second chances too, and be compassionate and merciful.

=== The Pirates Who Don't Do Anything: A VeggieTales Movie (2008) ===
Three lazy wannabe pirates go back in time to the 17th century to fight real pirates and become heroes in a battle, and to rescue a royal family from an evil tyrant. The three slackers learn that a hero does not have to be tall, strong, and handsome to be useful.

=== Cancelled Larryboy film ===
In January 2024, it was announced that Big Idea and Kingstone Studios were developing a Larryboy feature film with a projected 2026 theatrical release date. DreamWorks Animation story artist, Claire Morrissey, was hired to direct.

In April 2026, Phil Vischer suggested the film was no longer in development and confirmed its cancellation in June of that same year.

=== The Bob and Larry Movie ===
The origin story of VeggieTales hosts Bob the Tomato and Larry the Cucumber reveals how they met, how they got their own show, and answers the question how vegetables and fruit talk. This was intended to be the first film in the series to feature humans. According to Phil Vischer, "Since Jonah: A VeggieTales Movie was our Ten Commandments, The Bob and Larry Movie would be our Toy Story." The Bob and Larry Movie was originally planned to be the second VeggieTales film with a release date in late 2005. It was placed into production in early 2002, toward the end of production of Jonah. However, Big Idea Productions fell into bankruptcy in late 2002 and the film was placed on hiatus, deemed too expensive. Vischer then wrote The Pirates Who Don't Do Anything: A VeggieTales Movie to replace this movie.

Although a sequel to The Pirates Who Don't Do Anything was considered in 2008, development stalled when the Great Recession triggered the bankruptcy of parent companies Entertainment Rights and Classic Media. According to Vischer in 2018, "I have a copy of The Bob and Larry script on my laptop, but probably won't release it because it is technically owned by Universal Pictures and DreamWorks Animation. It will hopefully be produced in the near future."

According to Vischer, the film would have begun with a brief synopsis of how talking vegetables were involved in world history, which would be described as a "rare, but recurring phenomenon". One example would have shown tomb paintings of a pharaoh consulting with a leek. Bob the Tomato would be working in local TV news hosting a segment called "Farm Report", while Larry the Cucumber would work as a tester at a chicken hat factory (because his head was chicken-sized). Bob would make a report on the factory, and first meet Larry through several antics involving the chicken hats. Bob the Tomato would also be renting an apartment in a nightstand of a human boy named Dexter.

== Other media ==
=== Stage production ===
VeggieTales Live is a series of stage shows based on the VeggieTales videos that toured across the U.S. The first-stage series was part of a two-year agreement with Clear Channel in 2002. The shows were notable for featuring large inflatable VeggieTales character costumes designed by Michael Curry. Six versions of the shows have been staged through the years, with the last version touring in 2015. Exclusive theme park stage shows were also produced for Dollywood and Silver Dollar City.

=== Video games ===
Big Idea, and its successors, have released VeggieTales themed games on various platforms including PC, Macintosh, iOS, and Android. Applications include games revolving around specific VeggieTales episodes (such as the PlayStation 2 and Game Boy Advance releases of LarryBoy and the Bad Apple) to new content revolving around various VeggieTales characters.

PC

- Veggie Carnival (October 15, 2002)
- The Mystery of Veggie Island (2002)
- Jonah: A VeggieTales Game (2002)
- VeggieTales Creativity City (March 3, 2003)
- Minnesota Cuke and the Coconut Apes (September 23, 2003)
- VeggieTales Super Silly Fun! (2005)
- VeggieTales Dance Dance Dance (October 24, 2006)

Console

- LarryBoy and the Bad Apple, PlayStation 2 and Game Boy Advance (August 8, 2006)
- Veg-Out! Family Tournament, shipped pre-bundled in the Game Wave Family Entertainment System (December 10, 2007)

iOS and Android

- VeggieTales Just for Me Personalized App (2009)
- Step-by-Story presents: The Goofy Gift (2011)
- VeggieTales Spotisodes Collection (2012)
- Step-by-Story presents: Larry's Missing Music (2012)
- Step-by-Story presents: Thanks for the Franks (2012)
- Scribble My VeggieTales Story (2013)
- It's a Very Merry Larry Christmas (2013)
- VeggieTales Animated Devotional (2015)

=== Music ===
There have been over 45 musical albums released that tie into either VeggieTales characters or videos. Some albums are compilations of songs from the videos, such as Larry-Boy: The Soundtrack and the VeggieTunes series. Others contain completely original material and public domain songs not found in the videos, such as the holiday albums A Very Veggie Christmas and A Very Veggie Easter, in addition to sing-along albums like Bob and Larry's Campfire Songs and Junior's Bedtime Songs. Worship albums were also released, such as Christian Hit Music and Here I Am To Worship, as well as albums covering popular music, such as Bob and Larry Sing the 70's and Bob and Larry Sing the 80's.

=== Merchandise ===
==== Toys ====
On August 23, 2000, Fisher-Price introduced several VeggieTales products, including the "Bounce N Talk Veggies", "Sing N Dance Bob and Larry", "Junior Asparagus Bedtime Friend", "Veggie Bunch", "Talking Clip Ons", "Dress Up Mix Up Larry", an interactive "LarryBoy" doll, "Larrymobile", and a "Figure Pack" play-set. The Fisher Price products were sold at Walmart, Kmart, Toys "R" Us and Target stores until the end of 2004. Blue Box Toys also produced many VeggieTales products from 2002 until 2009. On January 1, 2005, the rights to VeggieTales were exclusively held to Blue Box Toys. On February 10, 2011, Big Idea Entertainment announced several new product promotions, including partnerships with Chick-fil-A (kids' meal promotions), American Puzzle Company (wooden puzzles and trains), CTI Industries (mylar and latex balloons), Tabbies (index tabs, stickers, temporary tattoos and wall clings), Victory Designs (children's guitars), and Zoobies (plush pillows and blankets).

==== Books and comics ====
In June 2014, B&H Kids announced plans to produce a VeggieTales comic series with Big Idea Productions and DreamWorks Classics.

=== Podcast ===
On May 17, 2022, a new weekly audio podcast series based around the VeggieTales characters was announced and released on multiple digital platforms. Titled Very Veggie Silly Stories, it centers on Bob and Larry hosting a podcast with their friends. It features original stories, interviews with special guests, and past songs from the VeggieTales musical library. The podcast also features a new voice cast replacing the Vischers and Nawrocki. The podcast received mixed to negative reception from fans who criticized the recasting of voice actors, performances, and writing.

=== Documentary ===
A TBN exclusive feature and documentary called VeggieTales: Behind the Scenes aired on TBN on August 19, 2022. It featured past interviews with Vischer and Nawrocki as well as highlighting The VeggieTales Show and Yippee TV.

== Reception and awards ==
VeggieTales has been nominated for three Emmy Awards, four Annie Awards, thirteen GMA Dove Awards, six Parents' Choice Awards, two Chicago Film Festival Awards, one Movieguide Award, one Golden Reel Award, and one International World Animation Celebration Festival Award. It was one of the earliest computer-animated franchises, predating both ReBoot and Toy Story.

As of 2019, VeggieTales has sold 75 million videos (VHS, DVD, and Blu-ray), 16 million books, 7 million music albums, and 235 million music streams. The revenue for Big Idea grew between 1996 and 1999 by 3300% from $1.3 million to over $44 million as the moral tales and off-beat humor proved popular with parents. According to Phil Vischer's book, Me, Myself, and Bob, "one third of American homes owned a Veggietales video by the year 2000". The Wall Street Journal commented on the franchise's success that "VeggieTales is the Barney of the group. Its simple characters, bright colors and catchy tunes sweeten the Christian message...The real appeal of the veggies is their wackiness. Like Bugs Bunny, the cartoons contain a multitude of adult jokes, and like a sanitized version of South Park, Comedy Central's raunchy cartoon, they rely on gross-out humor. Among evangelical Christian young adults, the veggies have a cult following, analogous to the adult audience of South Park.

Jonah: A VeggieTales Movie currently holds a 65% approval rating on Rotten Tomatoes based on 55 reviews from critics, with an average score of 5.8 out of 10. The Pirates Who Don't Do Anything received a 39% approval rating on Rotten Tomatoes based on 33 reviews, with an average rating of 4.7/10. Their summary of critical consensus was, "This Veggietale should please the youngest crowds, but the silly script will tire the more discerning viewer."

Year	Award	Nominated work	Result	Ref
1997	Chicago International Film Festival: Children's Jury Award for Best Animated Short Film	VeggieTales: Very Silly Songs!	Won	
1997	GMA Dove Award: Children's Music Album of the Year	A Very Veggie Christmas	Won	
1998	GMA Dove Award: Long Form Music Video of the Year	VeggieTales: Very Silly Songs!	Won	
1999	GMA Dove Award: Long Form Music Video of the Year	VeggieTales: The End of Silliness?	Nominated	
1999	AdQ Design Award: Outstanding Advertising Print Ad	VeggieTales: What's The Big Idea Magazine	Won	
2000	GMA Dove Award: Children's Music Album of the Year	Larry-Boy: The Soundtrack	Won	
2001	GMA Dove Award: Children's Music Album of the Year	VeggieTunes 3: A Queen, A King, and A Very Blue Berry	Won	
2001	Parents' Choice Award: Season's Best Family Home Entertainment	Veggietales: Lyle the Kindly Viking	Won	
2001	World Animation Celebration Festival: Best Animated Home Entertainment	VeggieTales: Lyle the Kindly Viking	Won	
2002	Annie Award: Best Animated Home Entertainment	VeggieTales: Lyle the Kindly Viking	Nominated	
2003	Annie Award: Best Animated Home Entertainment	VeggieTales: The Star of Christmas	Nominated	
2003	Annie Award: Best Voice Acting in an Animated Feature Production	Tim Hodge as the Voice of Khalil in Jonah: A VeggieTales Movie	Nominated	
2003	Golden Reel Award: Best Sound Editing in Television Direct to Video	Larryboy: The Cartoon Adventures ‘Angry Eyebrows'	Nominated	
2003	The Movieguide Awards: Best Family Movie of the Year	Jonah: A VeggieTales Movie	Won	
2003	GMA Dove Award: Children's Music Album of the Year	Jonah: A Veggie Tales Movie Original Soundtrack	Won	
2004	Annie Award: Best Animated Short Subject	"Belly Button" from Veggietales: The Ballad of Little Joe	Nominated	
2004	Chicago International Children's Film Festival: Children's Jury Award for Animated Short Film	"Belly Button" from Veggietales: The Ballad of Little Joe	Won	
2004	GMA Dove Award: Music Video of the Year	"Belly Button" from Veggietales: The Ballad of Little Joe	Nominated	
2005	Parents' Choice Award: Season's Best Family Home Entertainment	VeggieTales: Duke and the Great Pie War	Won	
2006	Parents' Choice Award: Season's Best Family Home Entertainment	VeggieTales: Sheerluck Holmes and the Golden Ruler	Won	
2007	GMA Dove Award: Children's Music Album of the Year	VeggieTales Worship Songs	Won	
2007	Parents' Choice Award: Season's Best Family Home Entertainment	VeggieTales: Larryboy and the Bad Apple	Won	
2008	GMA Dove Award: Children's Music Album of the Year	VeggieTales Christian Hits	Won	
2008	Parents' Choice Award: Season's Best Family Home Entertainment	VeggieTales: Tomato Sawyer's and Huckleberry Larry's Big River Rescue	Won	
2008	Robert A. Briner Impact Award	Phil Vischer for his 15 years of work on VeggieTales	Won	
2010	GMA Dove Award: Children's Music Album of the Year	Veggietales: Here I Am to Worship	Won	
2011	GMA Dove Award: Children's Music Album of the Year	Sweetpea's Songs for Girls	Nominated	
2011	Parents' Choice Award: Seasons Best Family Game	VeggieTales: Find It!	Won	
2012	GMA Dove Award: Children's Music Album of the Year	Hosanna! Today Top Worship Songs for Kids	Nominated	
2014	GMA Dove Award: Children's Music Album of the Year	VeggieTales 25 Favorite Bible Songs	Won	
2015	Emmy Award: Outstanding Animated Program	VeggieTales in the House Season One	Nominated	
2017	Emmy Award: Outstanding Sound Editing	VeggieTales in the House Season Four	Nominated	
2017	The Tennessee State House Resolution 68 Award: Life Time Achievement in Children's Entertainment	Mike Nawrocki for his 25 years of work on VeggieTales	Won	
2018	Emmy Award: Best Performer in an Animated Program	Tress MacNeille in VeggieTales in the City	Nominated	
