= Morphing =

Special effect

Morphing animation between two faces

Morphing is a special effect in motion pictures and animations that changes (or morphs) one image or shape into another through a seamless transition. Traditionally such a depiction would be achieved through dissolving techniques on film. Since the early 1990s, this has been replaced by computer software to create more realistic transitions. A similar method is applied to audio recordings, for example, by changing voices or vocal lines.

== Early transformation techniques ==
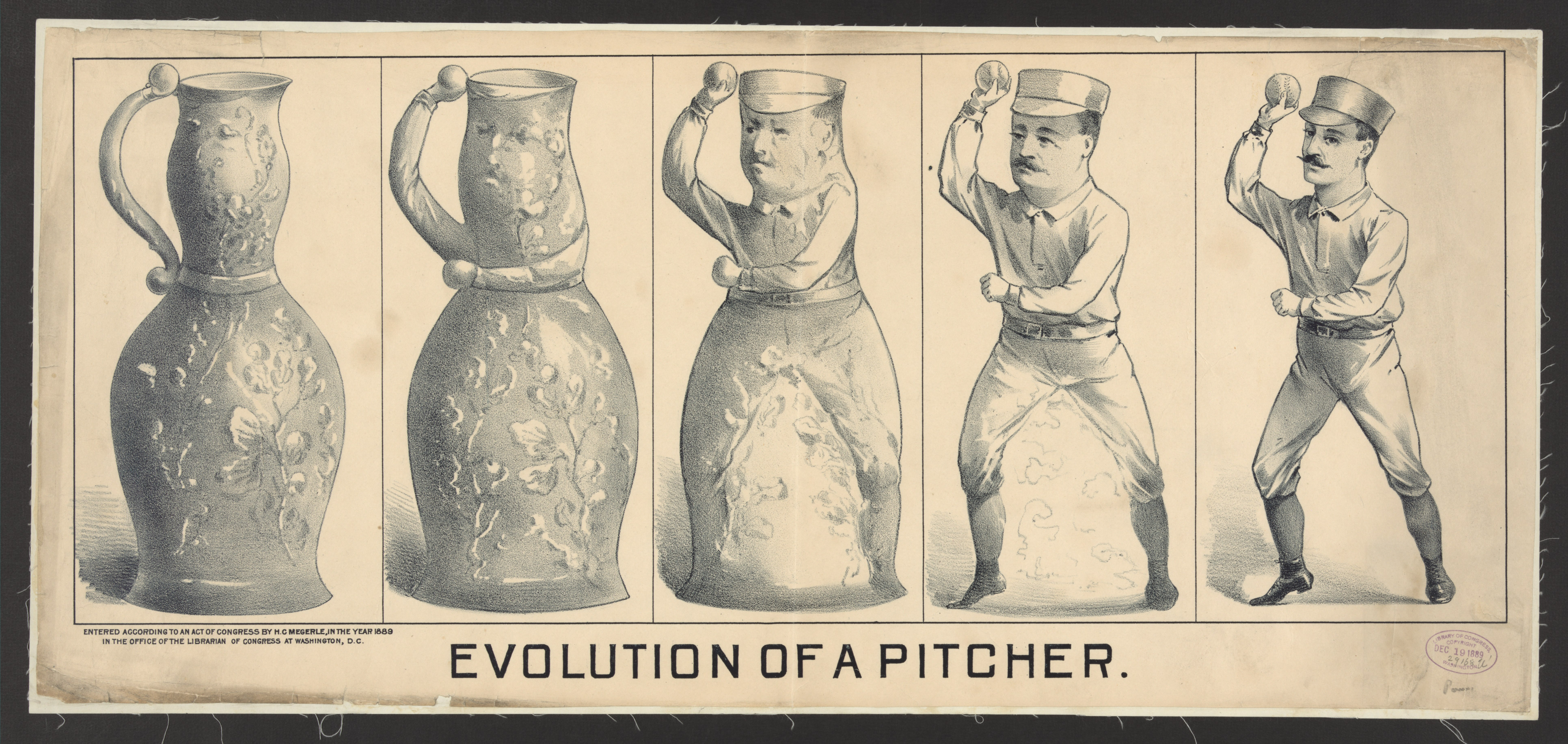
An illustration in which morphing is done through a series of individual drawings, representing a pun on the meanings of the word "pitcher"

Long before digital morphing, several techniques were used for similar image transformations. Some of those techniques are closer to a matched dissolve – a gradual change between two pictures without warping the shapes in the images – while others did change the shapes in between the start and end phases of the transformation.

=== Tabula scalata ===
Known since at least the end of the 16th century, Tabula scalata is a type of painting with two images divided over a corrugated surface. Each image is only correctly visible from a certain angle. If the pictures are matched properly, a primitive type of morphing effect occurs when changing from one viewing angle to the other.

=== Mechanical transformations ===
Around 1790 French shadow play showman François Dominique Séraphin used a metal shadow figure with jointed parts to have the face of a young woman changing into that of a witch.

Some 19th century mechanical magic lantern slides produced changes to the appearance of figures. For instance a nose could grow to enormous size, simply by slowly sliding away a piece of glass with black paint that masked part of another glass plate with the picture.

=== Matched dissolves ===
In the first half of the 19th century "dissolving views" were a popular type of magic lantern show, mostly showing landscapes gradually dissolving from a day to night version or from summer to winter. Other uses are known, for instance Henry Langdon Childe showed groves transforming into cathedrals.

The 1910 short film Narren-grappen shows a dissolve transformation of the clothing of a female character.

Maurice Tourneur's 1915 film Alias Jimmy Valentine featured a subtle dissolve transformation of the main character from respected citizen Lee Randall into his criminal alter ego Jimmy Valentine.

The Peter Tchaikovsky Story in a 1959 TV-series episode of Disneyland features a swan automaton transforming into a real ballet dancer.

In 1985, Godley & Creme created a "morph" effect using analogue cross-fades on parts of different faces in the video for "Cry".

=== Animation ===
In animation, the morphing effect was created long before the introduction of cinema. A phenakistiscope designed by its inventor Joseph Plateau was printed around 1835 and shows the head of a woman changing into a witch and then into a monster.

Émile Cohl's 1908 animated film Fantasmagorie featured much morphing of characters and objects drawn in simple outlines.

== Digital morphing ==
An animated example of an ape morphing into a bird

In the early 1990s, computer techniques capable of more convincing results saw increasing use. These involved distorting one image at the same time that it faded into another through marking corresponding points and vectors on the "before" and "after" images used in the morph. For example, one would morph one face into another by marking key points on the first face, such as the contour of the nose or location of an eye, and mark where these same points existed on the second face. The computer would then distort the first face to have the shape of the second face at the same time that it faded the two faces. To compute the transformation of image coordinates required for the distortion, the algorithm of Beier and Neely can be used.

=== Concerns ===
In 1993 concerns were raised about the authenticity of digitally altered images arising from morphing. Images of fake "tween" people found half way between two morphed people created a skeptical media long before AI.

=== Early examples ===
In or before 1986, computer graphics company Omnibus created a digital animation for a Tide commercial with a Tide detergent bottle smoothly morphing into the shape of the United States. The effect was programmed by Bob Hoffman. Omnibus re-used the technique in the movie Flight of the Navigator (1986). It featured scenes with a computer generated spaceship that appeared to change shape. The plaster cast of a model of the spaceship was scanned and digitally modified with techniques that included a reflection mapping technique that was also developed by programmer Bob Hoffman.

The 1986 movie The Golden Child implemented early digital morphing effects from animal to human and back.

Willow (1988) featured a more detailed digital morphing sequence with a person changing into different animals. A similar process was used a year later in Indiana Jones and the Last Crusade to create Walter Donovan's gruesome demise. Both effects were created by Industrial Light & Magic, using software developed by Tom Brigham and Doug Smythe (AMPAS).

In 1991, morphing appeared notably in the Michael Jackson music video "Black or White" and in the movies Terminator 2: Judgment Day and Star Trek VI: The Undiscovered Country. The first application for personal computers to offer morphing was Gryphon Software Morph on the Macintosh. Other early morphing systems included ImageMaster, MorphPlus and CineMorph, all of which premiered for the Amiga in 1992. Other programs became widely available within a year, and for a time the effect became common to the point of cliché. For high-end use, Elastic Reality (based on MorphPlus) saw its first feature film use in In The Line of Fire (1993) and was used in Quantum Leap (work performed by the Post Group). At VisionArt Ted Fay used Elastic Reality to morph Odo for Star Trek: Deep Space Nine. The Snoop Dogg music video "Who Am I? (What's My Name?)", where Snoop Dogg and the others morph into dogs. Elastic Reality was later purchased by Avid, having already become the de facto system of choice, used in many hundreds of films. The technology behind Elastic Reality earned two Academy Awards in 1996 for Scientific and Technical Achievement going to Garth Dickie and Perry Kivolowitz. The effect is technically called a "spatially warped cross-dissolve". The first social network designed for user-generated morph examples to be posted online was Galleries by Morpheus.

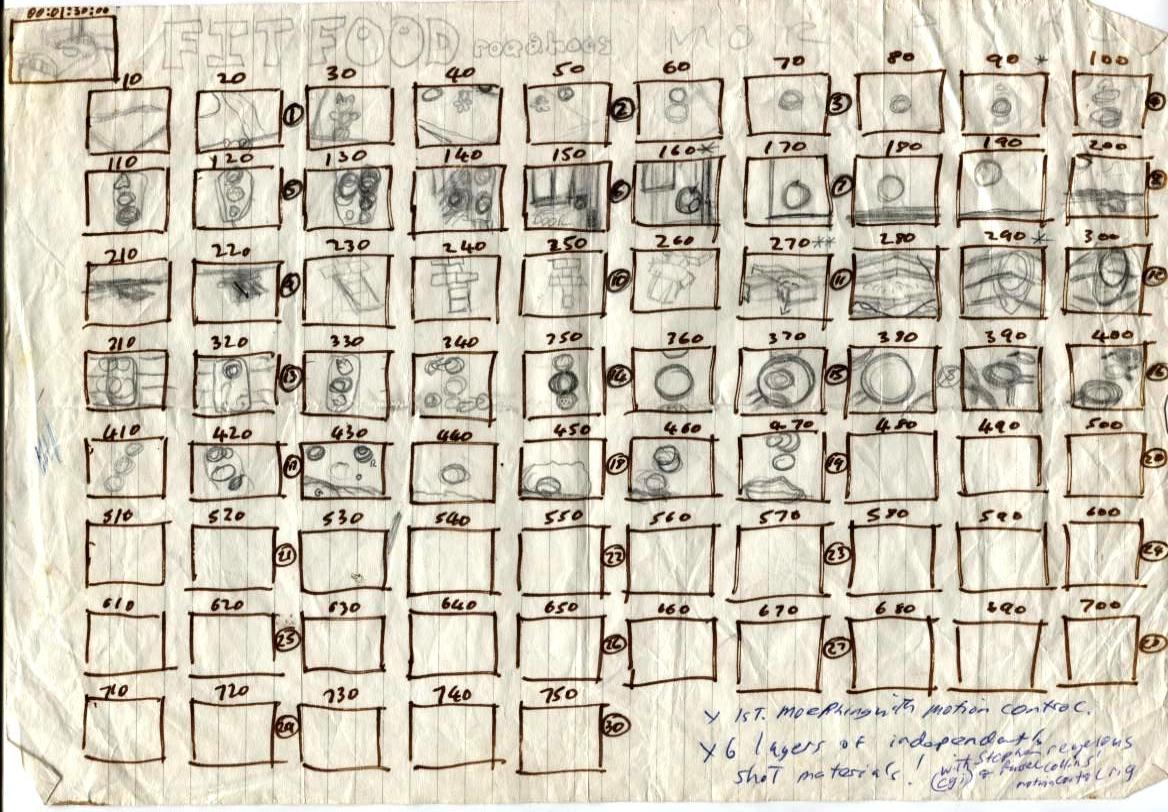
Storyboard for "Fit Food" NZ Cancer Society TV Commercial 1991-2 using Morphing with digitally controlled Motion Control. The technique employed 6 layers of independently sourced moving imagery.

In late 1991 Yeti Productions employed a young Stephen Regelous to run it's 486 computer graphics system in Wellington New Zealand. After producer Barry Thomas showed him Michael Jackson's "Black or White", Regelous wrote 10,000 lines of C++ code of triangle-based digital morphing software. Together they created morphing based TV commercials for The NZ Cancer Society, Fit food, Salvation Army and others. The Fit food commercial employed morphing with 35mm, pin registered, digitally controlled motion control designed and made by Russell Collins with software by Stephen Regelous.

In Taiwan, Aderans, a hair loss solutions provider, did a TV commercial featuring a morphing sequence in which people with lush, thick hair morph into one another, reminiscent of the end sequence of the "Black or White" video.

=== Present use ===
Morphing algorithms continue to advance and programs can automatically morph images that correspond closely enough with relatively little instruction from the user. This has led to the use of morphing techniques to create convincing slow-motion effects where none existed in the original film or video footage by morphing between each individual frame using optical flow technology. Morphing has also appeared as a transition technique between one scene and another in television shows, even if the contents of the two images are entirely unrelated. The algorithm in this case attempts to find corresponding points between the images and distort one into the other as they crossfade.

While perhaps less obvious than in the past, morphing is used heavily today. Whereas the effect was initially a novelty, today, morphing effects are most often designed to be seamless and invisible to the eye.

A particular use for morphing effects is modern digital font design. Using morphing technology, called interpolation or multiple master tech, a designer can create an intermediate between two styles, for example generating a semibold font by compromising between a bold and regular style, or extend a trend to create an ultra-light or ultra-bold. The technique is commonly used by font design studios.

== Software ==
- After Effects
- Animate
- Elastic Reality
- FantaMorph
- Gryphon Software Morph
- Morph Age
- Morpheus
- Nuke
- SilhouetteFX

== See also ==
- Mathematical morphology
- Morph target animation
- Inbetweening
- Beier–Neely morphing algorithm
- Visual effects
