= FantaMorph =

- FantaMorph 5 Deluxe running on macOS Tahoe
- Developer: Abrosoft Co.
- Operating system: Microsoft Windows and macOS
- Size: 7 MB for Windows and 15 MB for Mac
- Type: Morphing
- License: Shareware
- Website: www.fantamorph.com

FantaMorph is a morphing software for the creation of photo morphing pictures and sophisticated morph animation effects. It was developed by Abrosoft Co., who are based in Beijing, China. The category of this software is Image Editor or Animation in Graphics or Multimedia. FantaMorph supports both Windows and Mac operating system, and comes in three different editions: Standard, Professional and Deluxe.

== Applications ==
For Fun: FantaMorph is used to visually show the changing of the same object or the transformation between different things.

Do Research: FantaMorph works to identify the changes in the facial expression in some Psychological researches.

Face Image Processing: Based on the features of "Face Locator" and "Face Mixer", FantaMorph helps users to automatically detect the facial features (eyes, nose, mouth, etc.) and mix the feature/shape of multiple real faces to compose a virtual face.

== See also ==
- Capture NX
