= DOCAM =

DOCAM (Documentation and Conservation of the Media Arts Heritage) was an international alliance of researchers from various institutions and disciplines dedicated to the documentation and conservation of media arts. The project was the result of a five-year mandate lasting from 2005 until 2010. Outcomes of the project include a cataloguing guide incorporating case studies, a conservation guide explaining preservation issues specific to time-based media, a technological timeline, a documentation model for digital curation and preservation of time-based media, and a glossary and thesaurus for media arts.

== History ==
DOCAM was created in 2005 by the Daniel Langlois Foundation for Art, Science and Technology (DLF) and funded by the Social Sciences and Humanities Research Council of Canada (SSHRC). The project's five-year mandate from 2005-2010 allowed collaboration by museum and university professionals to develop educational tools and create solutions for problems threatening media arts and technological arts heritage.

== DOCAM Initiatives ==
The DOCAM Research Alliance focused on five main goals surrounding the documentation and conservation of media arts. A central purpose underlying these goals was the understanding of how media art can best be preserved in order to be re-displayed or re-used over time. For example, in order to re-display media arts created on obsolete systems, a decision must be made regarding whether to migrate the work to a new format or attempt to display the work in its original context using an emulator. Committees were formed around the focus areas of conservation and preservation, documentation and archival management, technological timeline, cataloguing structure, and terminology. The output of committee activities, including case studies, educational materials, guides, models, and seminar proceedings, are available to the public on DOCAM's website.

=== Conservation and Preservation ===
One of DOCAM's main initiatives was the undertaking of conservation and preservation case studies of digital, media art and architecture contained in museum and institutional collections. As an international alliance, DOCAM was not solely focused on Canadian art, but many participants were Canadian and most case studies involved Canadian art and artists. These case studies formed the basis for the development of manuals and best practice guidelines for professionals involved in media arts conservation and preservation, including DOCAM's Conservation Guide. For example, DOCAM examined Greg Lynn's Embryonic House, an early example of digital architectural design, to tackle preservation and conservation issues related to digital obsolescence and protection against loss of digital data due to instability of physical media.

=== Documentation and Archival Management ===
The DOCAM Documentation Model spans the entire lifecycle of a work of digital art and provides a framework for preservation that can be used by artists, institutions, and other stakeholders. The model is based on a highly modified version of the International Federation of Library Associations' Functional Requirements for Bibliographic Records (FRBR), a hierarchical model which describes entities as works, expressions, manifestations, or items. The DOCAM Documentation Model prioritizes several factors, including the uniqueness and range of document types for media art, a desire for hierarchical description, and documentation of a work's complete lifecycle.

=== Technological Timeline ===
Although it is currently available on DOCAM's website only as a partial static image, DOCAM's Technological Timeline is intended to present an interactive view of the history of media arts technology, including links to external resources. The timeline provides context for the case studies chosen by members of the DOCAM initiative by placing these case studies within a larger framework of technology and media arts. As a reflection of DOCAM's educational purpose, the timeline's audience includes students and teachers of visual art history in addition to museum and other information professionals.

=== Cataloguing Structure ===
The DOCAM Cataloguing Structure committee used case studies to examine the archival, technical, and ethical problems inherent in the description of media arts. For example, to protect the authenticity and integrity of media artwork, the cataloguing institution must include information about any preservation activities undertaken, including migration from obsolete or unstable media to newer software or hardware. The committee recommended several new cataloguing practices, including an artist questionnaire to gain context about the art and define the artistic concept and artist intent. The DOCAM Cataloguing Guide is the output of the committee's recommended best practices, many of which relate to establishing clear institutional policies and documenting cataloguing actions.

=== Terminology ===
In response to the ambiguity caused by the rapid creation and evolution of vocabulary related to media arts documentation and conservation, the DOCAM Terminology committee created the Glossaurus, a bilingual, faceted thesaurus of terms associated with DOCAM's work. The Glossaurus is conceived as a tool for cataloguers and others involved in the description of visual art, rather than as a tool for users searching for digital art.

== Impact ==
In addition to creating cataloguing and conservation guides and a documentation model, DOCAM organized several seminars during its five-year mandate. In 2006 and 2007, students in a new media preservation seminar contributed research and essays to the DOCAM website. DOCAM's case studies, models, and guides, along with a bibliography of associated research, serve as resources stored on the DOCAM website. The Canadian government continues to recommend the DOCAM Technological Timeline and Thesaurus as references for collection documentation vocabularies and standards.
