= List of VeggieTales books =

This is a list of books in the VeggieTales franchise.

== Stories ==
VeggieTales Stories
- Author: Phil Vischer, Doug Peterson, Karen Poth, Peggy Schaefer, Cindy Kenney, Doris Rikkers, Anne Kennedy Brady, Pamela Kennedy, Melinda Rathjen, Greg Fritz, Laura Neutzling, Lori Froeb
- Genre: Christian; Juvenile Fiction
- Publisher: Tommy Nelson, Zonderkidz, Simon and Schuster, Zondervan, WorthyKids, Ideals
- Published: 1997–2018
- No. of books: 43

Title	Year	Author(s)
Bob and Larry's ABCs	1997	Phil Vischer
Junior's Colors	1997	Phil Vischer
Pa Grape's Shapes	1997	Phil Vischer
Archibald's Opposites	1998	Phil Vischer
Time for Tom	1998	Phil Vischer
How Many Veggies?	1997	Phil Vischer
The Mess Detectives: The Trouble with Larry	2006	Doug Peterson
Bob and Larry in the Case of the Missing Patience	2011	Karen Poth
All Is Fair When We Share	2014	Karen Poth
I Thank God for This Day!	2013	Phil Vischer
Bob and Larry's Book of Prayers	2014	Peggy Schaefer
VeggieTales Bible Storybook	2006	Cindy Kenney, Karen Poth
Larry Makes a Choice	2014	Karen Poth
The Mess Detectives and the Case of the Lost Temper	2014	Karen Poth
The Fairest Town in the West	2011	Karen Poth
Bob and Larry's Creation Vacation	2011	Karen Poth
The VeggieTales Bible	2009	Doris Rikkers, Zonderkidz
Very Veggie Devos for Little Ones	2017	Anne Kennedy Brady, Pamela Kennedy
God Loves You Very Much	2003	Cindy Kenney
LarryBoy and the Mudslingers	2006; 2013	Doug Peterson; Karen Poth
Great Easter Egg Hunt	2014	Melinda Rathjen, Greg Fritz
Tale of Two Sumos	2004	Karen Poth
An Easter Carol	2004	Cindy Kenney
A Snoodle's Tale	2004	Phil Vischer
Thankfulness Song	2005	Phil Vischer
Veggie Values	2010	Zondervan
Junior Comes Clean	2013	Karen Poth
VeggieTales: Little Guys Can Do Big Things Too	2016	Laura Neutzling
God Is Bigger Than the Boogieman	2014	Phil Vischer
God is Bigger Than the Boogeyman and Other Bedtime Stories	2001	Cindy Kenney
Who Wants to Be a Pirate?	2011	Karen Poth
VeggieTales Veggie Values: A Board Book Collection	2010	Zonderkidz
God Made You Special!	2002; 2010; 2016	Eric Metaxas; Greg Fritz
Where's God When I'm S-Scared?	2004; 2007	Cindy Kenney; Karen Poth
A Knight to Remember	2005	Cindy Kenney, Doug Peterson
Christmas Is Finally Here	2011	Greg Fritz
VeggieTales: Easter Is Love	2016	Lori Froeb
Very Veggie Bedtime Prayers	2018	Pamela Kennedy, Anne Kennedy Brady
Sheerluck Holmes and the Case of the Missing Friend	2014	Karen Poth
Very Veggie 5-Minute Stories	2018	WorthyKids, Ideals
LarryBoy Meets the Bubblegum Bandit	2011	Karen Poth
Oh, Where Is My Hairbrush?	2013	Melinda Rathjen
Sheerluck Holmes and the Hounds of Baker Street	2006	Doug Peterson
Lord of the Beans	2005	Phil Vischer
Rack, Shack and Benny	1997	Phil Vischer
The Story of Flibber-o-loo	1997	Phil Vischer
Dave and the Giant Pickle	1997	Phil Vischer
LarryBoy and the Fib from Outer Space	1997; 2007	Phil Vischer; Karen Poth

== Comics ==
=== SuperComics ===
VeggieTales SuperComics
- Edited by: Aaron Linne
- Illustrator: Cory Jones
- Genre: Christian; Comic; Juvenile Fiction
- Publisher: B&H Publishing Group
- Published: 2015–2016
- No. of books: 18

==== Volume 1 ====
- Dave and the Giant Pickle
- Lyle the Kindly Viking
- LarryBoy and the Prideasaurus

==== Volume 2 ====
- The League of Incredible Vegetables
- LarryBoy and the Reckless Ruckus
- Josh and the Big Wall

==== Volume 3 ====
- Rack, Shack, and Benny
- MacLarry and the Stinky Cheese Battle
- LarryBoy and the Rude Beet

==== Volume 4 ====
- Minnesota Cuke and the Search for Samson's Hairbrush
- LarryBoy and the Quitter Critter Quad Squad
- Where's God When I'm S-Scared?

==== Volume 5 ====
- Tomato Sawyer and Huckleberry Larry's Big River Rescue
- King George and the Ducky
- LarryBoy and the Merciless Mango

==== Volume 6 ====
- The Ballad of Little Joe
- Veggies in Space: The Fennel Frontier
- LarryBoy and the Foolish Fig from Faraway
