= Beier–Neely morphing algorithm =

Image morphing is a technique to synthesize a fluid transformation from one image (source image) to another (destination image). Source image can be one or more than one images. There are two parts in the image morphing implementation. The first part is warping and the second part is cross-dissolving.

The algorithm of Beier and Neely is a method to compute a mapping of coordinates between 2 images from a set of lines; i.e., the warp is specified by a set of line pairs where the start-points and end-points are given for both images. The algorithm is widely used within morphing software.

Also noteworthy, this algorithm only discussed about the situation with at most 2 source images as there are other algorithms introducing multiple source images.

== See also ==
- Morphing
- Image warping
- Image processing
