= Psybadek =

1998 video game

- North American box art
- Developer: Psygnosis
- Publisher: Psygnosis
- Designer: Graham Sidwell
- Artist: Mick Harrison
- Composer: Mike Clarke
- Platform: PlayStation
- Release: EU: 1 November 1998; NA: 17 November 1998
- Genre: Platform
- Mode: Single-player

Psybadek is a 1998 platform video game developed and published by Psygnosis for the PlayStation. The game was sponsored by shoe company Vans.

== Plot ==
The evil Krakken has appeared and causes a rampage at the local "hoverdek" park, where "dekkers" Xako, Mia, and their friends practice their skillz. Using his powers, Krakken kidnaps the "dek kids" and magically transforms them into his minions all to make the place his new home. Now it is up to Xako and Mia to save their friends and stop Krakken's evil, sending him back to where he came from.

== Gameplay ==
The player warps to different worlds, known as time zones from a hub area. Each world is broken down into levels which consist of courses that the player must travel through on their hoverboard. In order to properly complete each world, the player must collect a certain number of stars, obtained along the course or by stomping on the heads of enemies. At the end of each world, the player faces a guardian which lies in wait at the end of the level. Some levels feature a shooting gallery format. Here the player character is positioned in the center and fires a weapon within a time limit.

Player characters have no weapons by default, and must pick them up from drop boxes scattered through the levels.

== Development ==
Psybadek was developed by Psygnosis at its Liverpool Headquarters. The game was designed by Graham Sidwell, and Nick Burcombe was the project lead. Programmer Stephen Balmer came up with the game's original concept of the player free-roaming across landscapes on a board, while concept designer Mick Harrison drew images of characters on hoverboards. According to Sidwell, the game was in development for both the PlayStation and PC, but the latter was scrapped because it "diluted" the design team's focus. Sidwell explained that creating Psybadek involved much trial-and-error, mainly due to the difficulty of melding traditional platform genre obstacles with sports-related "momentum". Sidwell emphasized the difference between Psybadek and other boarding games. "There's obviously the snowboarding feel to this game," he stated, "But unlike most games in which you're racing against the clock and performing tricks on the way down for points, in Psybadek, those tricks actually do something. The stunts themselves are weapons."

Psybadek was officially announced in May 1997, with a tentative release for the last quarter of that year. However, the entire development team was temporarily pulled away from the project in order to work on other Psygnosis games. After their releases, the developer continued work on Psybadek, attempting to improve its character motions, touch up its 3D environments, and expand the number of levels. Like many other Psygnosis titles at the time, Psybadek was created using Softimage 3D. Psygnosis partnered with California-based apparel company Vans to sponsor the game. Psybadek's in-game characters feature Vans clothing in exchange for the game's promotion at the Triple Crown series and the Warped Tour. The characters were designed to have a cute yet cool manga-style look.

== Reception ==
Reception

Aggregate score
Aggregator	Score
GameRankings	48%

Review scores
Publication	Score
AllGame	2/5
Electronic Gaming Monthly	2.5/10 (Note: Two critics of Electronic Gaming Monthly gave the game each a score of 2/10, and two others gave it each a score of 3/10.)
EP Daily	6/10
Game Informer	3.75/10
GameSpot	5.1/10
IGN	4/10
Jeuxvideo.com	14/20
Next Generation	1/5
PlayStation Official Magazine – UK	4/10
Official U.S. PlayStation Magazine	2/5

The game received unfavorable reviews according to the review aggregation website GameRankings. Next Generation said, "As a concept, Psybadek has been dangled in front of gamers for quite a while and created at least some excitement. It's a shame that because of bad designs, controls, and graphics, the potential was never realized." GamePro said that the game was "too annoying for novice gamers and just not entertaining for experts." (Note: GamePro gave the game 3/5 for graphics, 4/5 for sound, and two 2.5/5 scores for control and fun factor.)

GameRevolution listed Psybadek as eighth on their list of the 50 Worst Game Names Ever.
