= Gianni Polhemus =

American cyclist

Gianni Polhemus is a road bike racer from New York State. His large wins in 2011 include.

- Tour of Battenkill juniors
- New York State road, Time trial, and criterium

== Championships ==
- New York State Road, Criterium, Time Trial championships.
