= Excentris =

Arts complex in Montreal

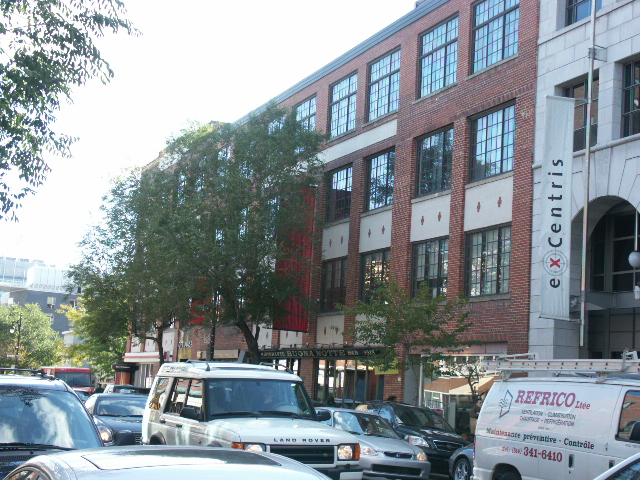
- Excentris on Saint-Laurent Boulevard
- Interactive map of the Excentris area

General information
- Type: Performing arts center; cinema
- Location: Saint-Laurent Boulevard, Montreal, Quebec, Canada
- Coordinates: 45.512996°N 73.571317°W
- Opened: June 1999
- Cost: CA$6.2 million
- Owner: Collège Salette (after 2018)

Technical details
- Floor area: 70,000 sq ft (6,500 m²)

Excentris was a performing arts center and cinema located on Saint-Laurent Boulevard in Montreal, Quebec. The complex was conceived by Daniel Langlois as a laboratory for digital media production as well as a screening venue. It was opened in June 1999, after two years of construction at a cost of CA$6.2 million, and covered 70,000 square feet (6,500 m^{2}).

Excentris ran into financial difficulty in 2009 and was forced to shut down two of its three cinemas. It was revived as a three-screen complex in 2011, with the help of a $4 million loan from Quebec provincial film funding agency SODEC, $2.75 million from the City of Montreal, and $1 million from the Daniel Langlois Foundation.

The centre closed its doors in November 2015, citing financial difficulties. Cinéma Parallèle, the non-profit organization that ran the center, entered bankruptcy protection in May 2015.

In 2018 the building was sold to Collège Salette for CA$1.6 million.
