= James S. Polhemus House =

Historic building in Portland, Oregon, U.S.

- U.S. National Register of Historic Places
- Portland Historic Landmark
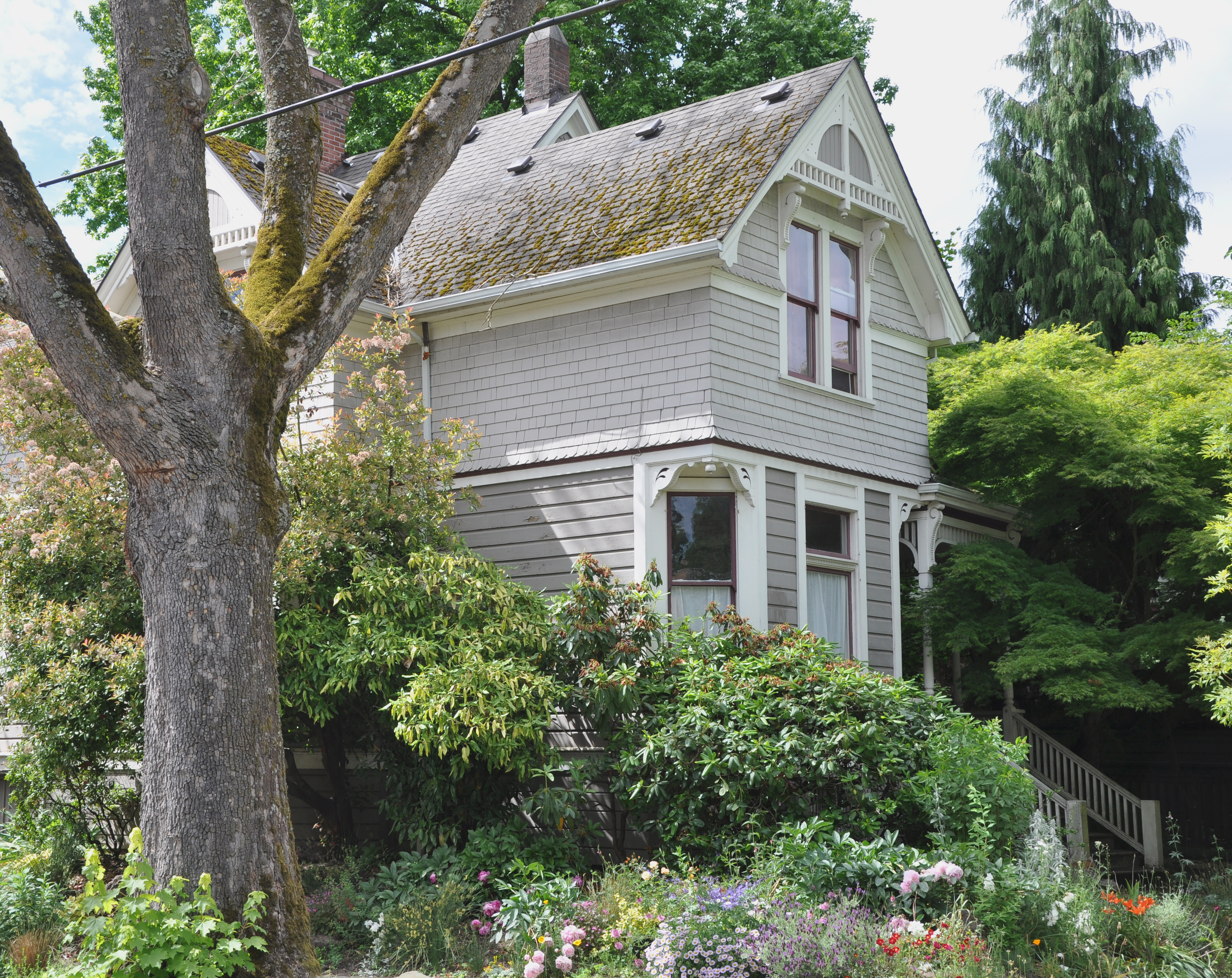
- James S. Polhemus House in 2011

- Location within Portland, Oregon
- Location: 135 SE 16th Avenue; Portland, Oregon
- Coordinates: 45°31′18″N 122°38′59″W
- Built: 1900
- Architectural style: Queen Anne
- MPS: Portland Oregon’s Eastside Historic and Architectural Resources, 1850-1938
- NRHP reference No.: 89000110
- Added to NRHP: March 8, 1989

The James S. Polhemus House is a house located in southeast Portland, Oregon, listed on the National Register of Historic Places.

James H. Polhemus, the son of James S., was a general manager of the Port of Portland in the 1930s.

== See also ==
- National Register of Historic Places listings in Southeast Portland, Oregon
