= Engineering Emmy Awards =

Engineering Emmy Awards, recognizing outstanding achievement in engineering development in the television industry, are presented at the following ceremonies:

- Primetime Engineering Emmy Awards, presented by the Academy of Television Arts & Sciences.
- Technology and Engineering Emmy Awards, presented by the National Academy of Television Arts and Sciences.
