= Daniel Langlois =

Canadian businessman (1957–2023)

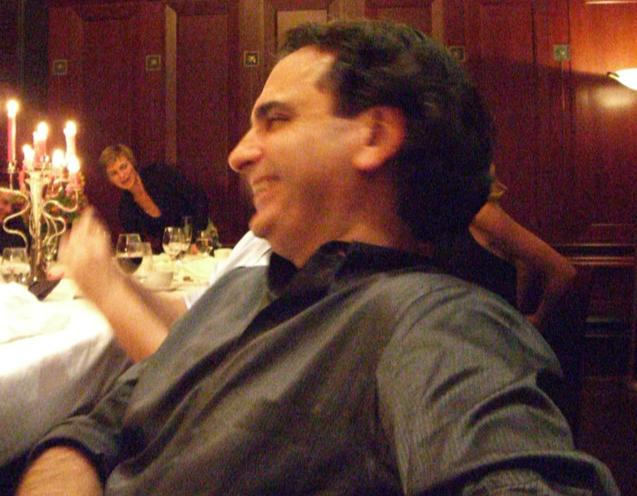

Daniel Langlois OC CQ (6 April 1957 – 2023) was a Canadian businessman who was the president and founder of the Daniel Langlois Foundation, Ex-Centris, and Media Principia Inc.

He was the founder and inaugural president of Softimage Inc., which was recognized in the fields of cinema and media creation back in the 1990s for its digital technologies, in particular its 3-D computer animation techniques. Its software was used to create 3-D effects in such films as The Matrix, Titanic, Men in Black, Jurassic Park, and Terminator 2, and was used to fully animate early CGI shows such as Veggietales.

Langlois and his girlfriend were shot and killed as part of a property dispute with neighbors, and two suspects were convicted and sentenced for the crime.

== Early life and education ==
Langlois was born on 6 April 1957 in Jonquière, Quebec, Canada.

He earned a bachelor of design degree from the Université du Québec à Montréal.

== Film career ==
Langlois worked for eight years as a film director and animator for private companies and the National Film Board of Canada. During this time, he made contributions to the film industry, especially to the field of computer graphics. He gained recognition for his work on Transitions, the first stereoscopic 3-D computer animation in IMAX format (presented at Expo 86). He also had a hand in the 1985 film Tony de Peltrie, which garnered several international awards.

Langlois also founded Softimage Inc., serving as its president and chief technology officer from November 1986 to July 1998. The company is recognized in the fields of cinema and media creation for its digital technologies, especially its 3-D computer animation techniques. Softimage software was used to create 3-D effects in such films as The Matrix, Titanic, Men in Black, Jurassic Park, and The Mask.

Langlois was president and founder of the Daniel Langlois Foundation, Ex-Centris, and Media Principia Inc.

== Later career: sustainable development ==
In later years, Daniel Langlois was involved in sustainable development and research projects for the creation of self-sustainability for small communities and some industrial sectors such as the hospitality sector. Coulibri Ridge, which is part of this research process in Dominica, was awarded Gold and Platinum Winner as well as Grand Winner in the Hotel and Tourism Development category at the 15th Edition of the Grands Prix du Design 2022.

== Recognition and honours ==
- 1994: Named by Ernst & Young as Canada's national entrepreneur of the year
- 1996: Honorary doctorate in administration, Université de Sherbrooke
- 1997: Scientific and Technical Oscar, from the Academy of Motion Picture Arts and Sciences
- 1999: Knight of the National Order of Quebec
- 2000: Officer of the Order of Canada
- 2002: Honorary doctorate, McGill University
- 2004: Great Montrealer
- 2004: Honorary doctorate, Concordia University
- 2005: Honorary doctorate, Université du Québec à Montréal
- 2008: Honorary doctorate, University of Ottawa
- 2016: Officer of the Order of Montreal

== Death and investigation ==
On 1 December 2023, police in Dominica found a burnt out car near Galion containing the bodies of Langlois and his partner Dominique Marchand. Both victims were shot and killed in what police described as a probable ambush. According to Dominica News Online and other local sources, the couple had been missing for a few days. They reported that three people had been detained and were being questioned by police. On 6 December 2023, it was reported that in fact the police in Dominica had made four arrests in the case, and that two of the suspects, Jonathan Lehrer and Robert Snyder, had been charged with murder in a court in Roseau, Dominica's capital.

Lehrer, a man from New Jersey, owned a property, Bois Cotlette Estate, next to Langlois's and Marchand's luxurious eco-resort and had been involved in litigation with Langlois five years before the murders in a matter dealing with a public roadway. Lehrer protested his innocence and his legal team claimed that there is no evidence of his guilt. Initially denied bail, Lehrer was granted it in November 2024 due to "“misrepresentation of the quality of evidence”. However, while bail conditions were being determined, and before he could be released, he was charged with weapons trafficking, which removed the possibility of bail. He was denied bail for the firearms charges in March 2025. In August 2025, the court determined that there was enough evidence in the murder case against Lehrer and Snyder for them to go to trial at the High Court. The same month, Lehrer was denied bail once again.

On July 28, 2026 Jonathan Lehrer and Robert Snyder were found guilty of murdering Daniel Langlois and Dominique Marchand.

== Daniel Langlois Foundation ==
The Daniel Langlois Foundation is a non-profit, philanthropic organization endowed by Daniel Langlois and chartered in 1997 with the mission to support artistic and scientific projects and research dedicated to further general human awareness as well as the understanding of human relation with its natural and technological environment.

The purpose of the foundation is to further artistic and scientific knowledge by fostering the meeting of art and science in the field of technologies and the environment. The Foundation seeks to nurture a critical awareness of technology's implications for human beings and their natural and cultural environments, and to promote the exploration of aesthetics suited to evolving human environments. The Foundation Centre for Research and Documentation (CR+D) seeks to document history, artworks and practices associated with electronic and digital media arts and to make this information available to researchers in an innovative manner through data communications.

In 2005, the foundation initiated the development of DOCAM (Documentation and Conservation of the Media Arts Heritage). This international research alliance's primary objective is to develop new methodologies and tools to address the issues of preserving and documenting technological and electronic works of art.

The Daniel Langlois Foundation, DOCAM, and its Centre for Research and Documentation are located in Montreal. In 2011, the entire collection of the foundation was donated to the Cinémathèque québécoise.

Resilient Dominica (RezDM.org) is a Non-Government Organisation (NGO) formed in 2018 shortly after Hurricane Maria by the Daniel Langlois Foundation in an attempt to rebuild and strengthen resilience in Dominica in the communities of Soufriere, Scotts Head, and Gallion.
