= Softimage 3D =

3D graphics program

Softimage Creative Environment

- Screenshot of Softimage 3D 3.9.2
- Developer: Softimage
- Release: January 1989; 37 years ago (Note: The beta version was released in SIGGRAPH in 1988.)
- Stable release: 4.0 / August 2001; 25 years ago
- Operating system: Windows NT, IRIX
- Successor: Softimage|XSI
- Type: 3D computer graphics
- License: Proprietary
- Website: softimage.com

Softimage 3D, stylized as Softimage|3D, is a discontinued high-end 3D graphics application developed by Softimage, which was used predominantly in the film, broadcasting, gaming, and advertising industries for the production of 3D animation. It was superseded by Softimage XSI in 2000.

== History ==
In 1986, National Film Board of Canada filmmaker Daniel Langlois, in partnership with software engineers Richard Mercille and Laurent Lauzon, began developing an integrated 3D modeling, animation, and rendering package with a graphical interface targeted at visual artists. The software was initially demonstrated at SIGGRAPH in 1988 and was released for Silicon Graphics workstations the following year as the Softimage Creative Environment.

Softimage Creative Environment was adopted by major visual effects studios like Industrial Light & Magic (ILM) and Digital Domain for use in their production pipelines, which also typically included software from Alias Research, Big Idea Productions, Kroyer Films, Angel Studios, Walt Disney Animation Studios, and Pixar Animation Studios as well as a variety of custom tools. Its character animation toolset expanded substantially with the addition of inverse kinematics in version 2, which was used to animate the dinosaurs in Jurassic Park. In 1994, Microsoft acquired Softimage with the intention of introducing high-end 3D animation software to its Windows NT platform, and subsequently renamed it "Softimage 3D". In January 1995, Softimage 3D was announced as the official 3D development tool for the Sega Saturn.

The first Windows port of Softimage 3D, version 3.0, was released in early 1996. Softimage 3D Extreme 3.5, released later that year, included particle effects and the mental ray renderer, which offered area lights, ray tracing, and other advanced features. 3D paint functionality was added a year later in version 3.7.

In the late 1990s, Softimage began developing a successor to Softimage 3D codenamed "Sumatra", which was designed with a more modern and extensible architecture to compete with other major packages like Alias|Wavefront's Maya. Development was delayed during a 1998 acquisition by Avid Technology, and in August 2000 Softimage 3D's successor was finally released as Softimage XSI. Because of Softimage 3D's entrenched user base, minor revisions continued until the final version of Softimage 3D, version 4.0, was released in 2002.

=== Release history ===
Version	Platform	Release date	Notes
Softimage Creative Environment 1.0	IRIX	January 1989	Beta debuted at SIGGRAPH '88, v1.0 commercial release in 1989
Softimage Creative Environment 1.5	IRIX	1989	
Softimage Creative Environment 1.65	IRIX	1989	Added texture mapping
Softimage Creative Environment 2.0	IRIX	1991	Introduced Actor module, IK, constraints, deformation lattices
Softimage Creative Environment 2.5	IRIX	1991	
Softimage Creative Environment 2.6	IRIX	1993	Added clusters, weighted envelopes. Used in Jurassic Park
Softimage Creative Environment 2.65	IRIX	1994	
Softimage 3D 3.0	IRIX; Windows NT	January 1996	First Windows release
Softimage 3D 3.5	IRIX; Windows NT	May 1996	Introduced Extreme edition (metaballs, mental ray)
Softimage 3D 3.7	IRIX; Windows NT	April 1997	Added 3D paint, NURBS surface blending
Softimage 3D 3.7 SP1	IRIX; Windows NT	August 1997	New selection & viewing tools, RenderMap, Nintendo 64 support
Softimage 3D 3.8	IRIX; Windows NT	July 1998	Added animation sequencer, polygon/color reduction tools
Softimage 3D 3.8 SP1	IRIX; Windows NT	January 1999	First release by Avid Technology, Plus & Performance options
Softimage 3D 3.8 SP2	IRIX; Windows NT	August 1999	Mental Ray 2.1, Surface Continuity Manager, DropPoints & SlidePoints, GoWithTheFlow
Softimage 3D 3.9	IRIX; Windows NT	March 2000	Improved envelope weighting, updated GUI
Softimage 3D 3.9.1	IRIX; Windows NT	May 2000	
Softimage 3D 3.9.2	IRIX; Windows NT	December 2000	
Softimage 3D 3.9.2.2	IRIX; Windows NT	May 2001	
Softimage 3D 4.0	IRIX; Windows NT	May 2002	Added multi-UV texturing, vertex colors. Final release

== Features ==
The Softimage 3D feature set was divided between five menu sets: Model, Motion, Actor, Matter and Tools, each corresponding to a different part of the 3D production process:

Softimage Creative Environment 2.66 - Matter module with Render Setup dialogue box

Model: Tools for creating spline, polygon, patch, and NURBS primitives (later releases also included Metaballs). Boolean operations, extrusions, revolves, and bevels, as well as lattice deformations and relational modeling tools. Subdivision surface modeling was available via a third-party plugin from Phoenix Tools called MetaMesh.

Motion: Animation of objects and parameters via keyframes, constraints, mathematical expressions, paths, and function curves. Animatable cluster and lattice deformations. Motion-capture through a variety of input devices.

Actor: Rigging and animation of digital characters using skeletons, as well as dynamics tools for physics simulations of object interactions. Included inverse kinematics and weighted/rigid skinning.

Matter: Creation of materials and rendering images for output. Standard features included 2D and 3D textures, field rendering, fog, motion blur, and raytracing.

Tools: Utilities for viewing, editing, and compositing-rendered image sequences, color reduction, and importing/exporting images and 3D geometry.
