= Autodesk Softimage =

Discontinued 3D graphics software

- User interface of Softimage 2011
- Original author: Softimage, Co.
- Developer: Autodesk
- Release: August 2000; 26 years ago (as Softimage|XSI)
- Stable release: 2015 / April 14, 2014; 12 years ago
- Operating system: Linux, Microsoft Windows
- Type: 3D computer graphics
- License: Trialware
- Website: Archived 2025-11-24 at the Wayback Machine

Autodesk Softimage is a discontinued 3D computer graphics application, for producing 3D computer graphics, 3D modeling, and computer animation. Owned by Autodesk and formerly titled Softimage XSI (stylized as Softimage|XSI), the software was predominantly used in the film, video game, and advertising industries for creating computer generated characters, objects, and environments.

Released in August 2000 as the successor to Softimage 3D, Softimage XSI was developed by its eponymous company, then a subsidiary of Avid Technology. On October 23, 2008, Autodesk acquired the Softimage brand and 3D animation assets from Avid for approximately $35 million, thereby ending Softimage Co. as a distinct entity. In February 2009, Softimage XSI was rebranded Autodesk Softimage.

A free version of the software, called Softimage Mod Tool, was developed for the game modding community to create games using the Microsoft XNA toolset for PC and Xbox 360, or to create mods for games using Valve's Source engine, Epic Games's Unreal Engine and others. It was discontinued with the release of Softimage 2015.

On March 4, 2014, it was announced that Autodesk Softimage would be discontinued after the release of the 2015 version, providing product support until April 30, 2016.

== Overview ==
Autodesk Softimage was a 3D animation application comprising a suite of computer graphics tools.

Modeling tools allowed the generation of polygonal or NURBS models. Subdivision modeling required no additional operators and worked directly on the polygonal geometry. Each modeling operation was tracked by a construction history stack, which enabled artists to work non-destructively. Operators in history stacks could be re-ordered, removed or changed at any time, and all adjustments propagated to the final model.

Control rigs were created using bones with automatic IK, constraints and specialized solvers like spine or tail. Optionally, the ICE system could be used to create light-weight rigs in a node-based environment. The rigging process could be sped up through the use of adaptable biped and quadruped rigs, FaceRobot for facial rigs and automatic lip syncing.

Animation features included layers and a mixer, which allowed combining animation clips non-linearly. Animation operators were tracked in a construction history stack that was separate from the modeling stack, enabling users to change the underlying geometry of already animated characters and objects. MOTOR was a feature that transferred animation between characters, regardless of their size or proportions. GATOR could transfer attributes such as textures, UVs, weight maps or envelopes between different models. Softimage also contained tools to simulate particles, particle strands, rigid body dynamics, soft body dynamics, cloth, hair and fluids.

The default and tightly integrated rendering engine in Softimage was mental ray. Materials and shaders were built in a node-based fashion. When users activated a so-called render region in a camera view, it would render this section of the scene using the specified rendering engine and update completely interactively. A secondary rendering mode was available for rendering real-time GPU shaders written in either the Cg or HLSL languages.

Also included is the VFX Tree, which was a built-in node-based compositor that had direct access to image clips used in the scene. It could thus not only be used to finalize and composite rendered frames, but also as an integral part of scene creation. The VFX Tree could be used to apply compositing effects to image clips being used in the fully rendered scene, allowing Softimage to render scenes using textures authored or modified in various ways within the same scene.

In addition to the node-based ICE platform described below, Softimage had an extensive API and scripting environment that could be used to extend the software. The available scripting languages included C#, Python, VBScript and JScript. A C++ SDK was also available for plug-in developers, with online documentation available to the public.

Softimage used the dotXSI ASCII file format for storing scene data. It was based on DirectX's X file format.

=== ICE Interactive Creative Environment ===
This simple ICE graph deforms an input object (in the example a sphere was used) based on its vertex indices.

On July 7, 2008, the Softimage, Co. announced Softimage XSI 7, which introduced the ICE (Interactive Creative Environment) architecture. ICE is a visual programming platform that allows users to extend the capabilities of Softimage quickly and intuitively using a node-based dataflow diagram. This enables artists to create complex 3D effects and tools without scripting. Among the main uses for ICE are procedural modeling, deformation, rigging and particle simulation. It can also be used to control scene attributes without the need to write expressions, for example to add camera wiggle or make a light pulsate. ICE is a parallel processing engine that takes advantage of multi-core CPUs, giving users highly scalable performance.

ICE represents Softimage functionality using a collection of nodes, each with its own specific capabilities. Users can connect nodes together, visually representing the data flow, to create powerful tools and effects. Softimage ships with several hundred nodes; among them are both low-level nodes, such as Multiply or Boolean, as well as a number of high-level nodes called compounds. Compounds serve as "wrapper nodes" to collapse ICE graphs into a single node. Softimage allows users to add custom compounds to its main menu system for easy reusability.

The screenshot on the right shows an example of a simple geometry deformation ICE graph. In a practical scenario, one would collapse the graph into a compound and expose important parameters, for instance the deformation intensity. After adding the tool to the user interface, it can easily be applied to other objects. Compounds can also be shared between installations because their entire functionality is stored in XML files.

The graph-based approach of ICE allows for the creation of effects previously attainable only through the use of scripting and/or compiled code. Due to its visual nature and interactivity, it is very accessible for users with no programming experience. Many free and commercial ICE tools have been made available by users and 3rd party developers. Softimage contains an ICE-based fluid and physics simulator called Lagoa as well as an ICE-based version of the Syflex cloth simulator.

== Industry usage ==
Softimage XSI (and its predecessor Softimage 3D) was primarily used in the film, video game and advertising industries as a tool to generate digital characters, environments and visual effects. Examples of films and other media made with the help of Softimage are Jurassic Park, Terminator 2: Judgment Day, Thor, Predators, District 9, White House Down, Yakuza, and Elysium.

== Releases ==
- Autodesk Softimage 2015 released April 14, 2014
- Autodesk Softimage 2014 released April 12, 2013
- Autodesk Softimage 2013 released April 12, 2012
- Autodesk Softimage 2012 SAP (Subscription Advantage Pack) released September 27, 2011
- Autodesk Softimage 2012 released April 7, 2011
- Autodesk Softimage 2011 SAP (Subscription Advantage Pack) released October 7, 2010
- Autodesk Softimage 2011 released April 9, 2010
- Autodesk Softimage 2010 released September 14, 2009
- Autodesk Softimage 7.5 released February 20, 2009
