= Harley-Davidson =

American motorcycle manufacturer

Harley-Davidson, Inc.

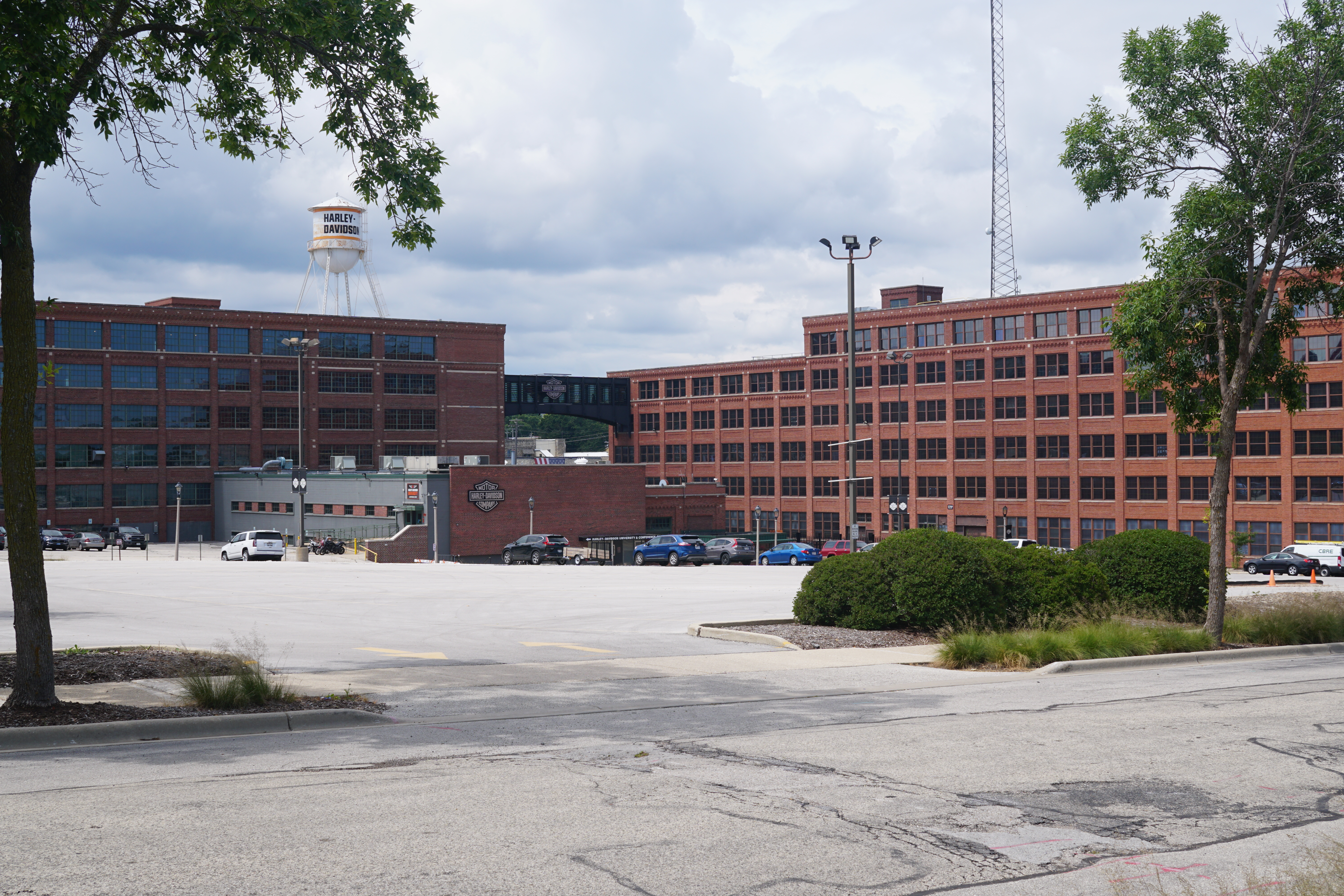
- Harley-Davidson headquarters in Milwaukee
- Type: Public
- Traded as: NYSE: HOG; S&P 400 component
- ISIN: US4128221086
- Industry: Automotive
- Founded: 1903; 123 years ago
- Founders: William S. Harley; Arthur Davidson; Walter Davidson; William A. Davidson
- Headquarters: Milwaukee, Wisconsin, U.S. 43°02′46″N 87°57′36″W
- Key people: Artie Starrs (President and CEO)
- Products: Motorcycles
- Production output: ▼162,771 units (2023)
- Revenue: ▼US$4.47 billion (2025)
- Net income: ▼US$339 million (2025)
- Number of employees: c. 6,400 (2023)
- Subsidiaries: Harley-Davidson EMEA; Harley-Davidson Brazil; Harley-Davidson India; Harley-Davidson Asia
- Website: www.harley-davidson.com

Harley-Davidson, Inc. (H-D, or simply Harley) is an American motorcycle manufacturer and lifestyle brand headquartered in Milwaukee, Wisconsin. Founded in 1903, it is one of two major American motorcycle manufacturers to survive the Great Depression along with its historical rival, Indian Motorcycle Company. The company has survived numerous ownership arrangements, subsidiary arrangements, periods of poor economic health and product quality, and intense global competition to become an iconic brand widely known for its loyal following. There are owner clubs and events worldwide, as well as a company-sponsored, brand-focused museum.

Harley-Davidson is noted for a style of customization that gave rise to the chopper motorcycle style. The company traditionally marketed heavyweight, air-cooled cruiser motorcycles with engine displacements greater than 700 cc, but it has broadened its offerings to include more contemporary VRSC (2002) and middle-weight Street (2014) platforms.

Harley-Davidson manufactures its motorcycles at factories in York, Pennsylvania; Menomonee Falls, Wisconsin; Tomahawk, Wisconsin; Manaus, Brazil; and Rayong, Thailand. The company markets its products worldwide, and also licenses and markets merchandise under the Harley-Davidson brand, among them apparel, home décor and ornaments, accessories, toys, scale models of its motorcycles, and video games based on its motorcycle line and the community.

== History ==
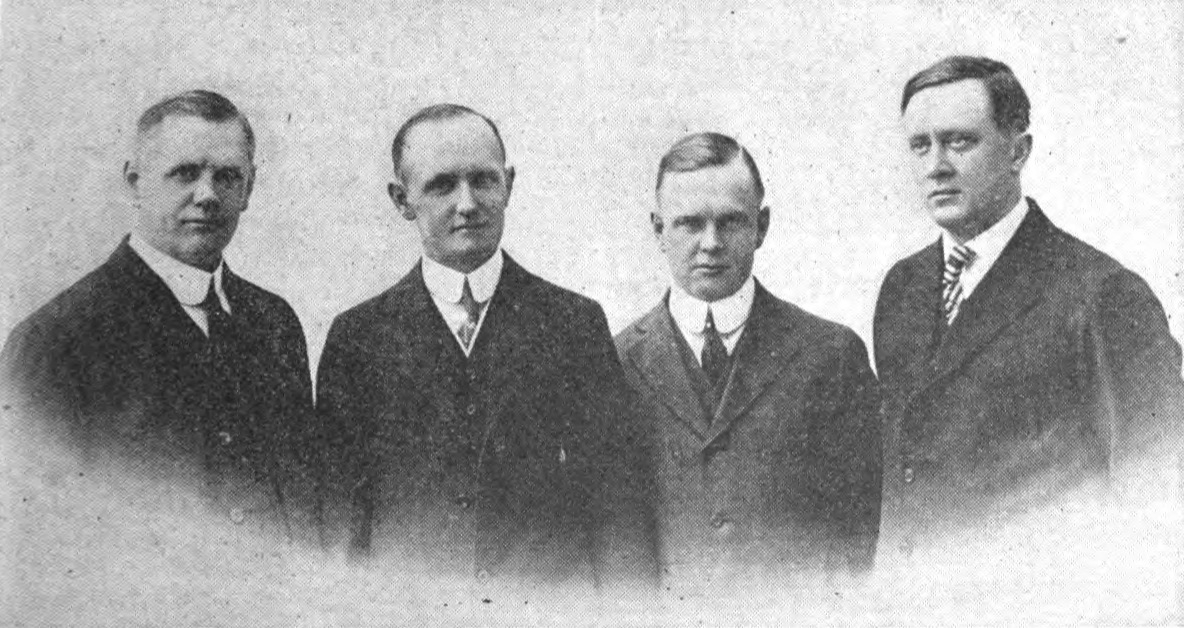
From left: William A. Davidson, Walter Davidson Sr., Arthur Davidson and William S. Harley

In 1901, 20-year-old William S. Harley drew up plans for a small engine with a displacement of 7.07 cubic inches (116 cc) and four-inch (102 mm) flywheels designed for use in a regular pedal-bicycle frame. Over the next two years, he and his childhood friend Arthur Davidson worked on their motor-bicycle using the northside Milwaukee machine shop at the home of their friend Henry Melk. It was finished in 1903 with the help of Arthur's brother Walter Davidson. Upon testing their power-cycle, Harley and the Davidson brothers found it unable to climb the hills around Milwaukee without pedal assistance, and they wrote off their first motor-bicycle as a valuable learning experiment.

The three began work on a new and improved machine with an engine of 24.74 cubic inches (405 cc) with 9.75 in (24.8 cm) flywheels weighing 28 lb (13 kg). Its advanced loop-frame pattern was similar to the 1903 Milwaukee Merkel motorcycle designed by Joseph Merkel, later of Flying Merkel fame. The bigger engine and loop-frame design took it out of the motorized bicycle category and marked the path to future motorcycle designs. They also received help with their bigger engine from outboard motor pioneer Ole Evinrude, who was then building gas engines of his own design for automotive use on Milwaukee's Lake Street.

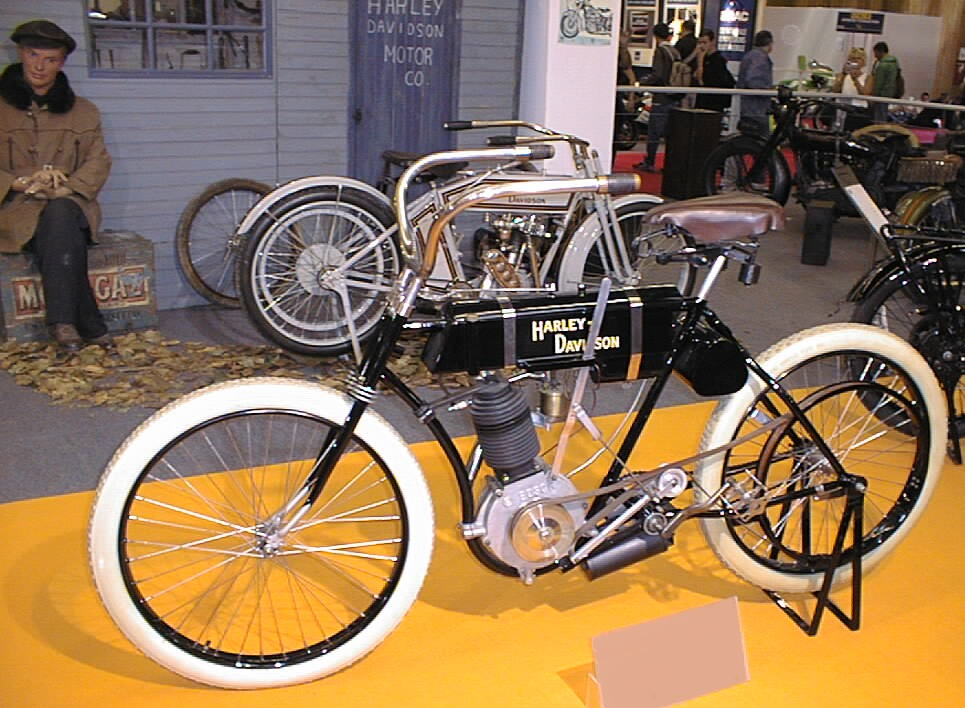
Prototype

The prototype of the new loop-frame Harley-Davidson was assembled in a 10 ft × 15 ft (3.0 m × 4.6 m) shed in the Davidson family backyard. Most of the major parts, however, were made elsewhere, including some probably fabricated at the West Milwaukee railshops where oldest brother William A. Davidson was toolroom foreman. This prototype machine was functional by September 8, 1904, when it competed in a Milwaukee motorcycle race held at State Fair Park. Edward Hildebrand rode it and placed fourth in the race.

In January 1905, the company placed small advertisements in the Automobile and Cycle Trade Journal offering bare Harley-Davidson engines to the do-it-yourself trade. By April, they were producing complete motorcycles on a very limited basis. That year, Harley-Davidson dealer Carl H. Lang of Chicago sold three bikes from the five built in the Davidson backyard shed. Years later, the company moved the original shed to the Juneau Avenue factory where it stood for many decades as a tribute.

In 1906, Harley and the Davidson brothers built their first factory on Chestnut Street (later Juneau Avenue), at the current location of Harley-Davidson's corporate headquarters. The first Juneau Avenue plant was a 40 ft × 60 ft (12 m × 18 m) single-story wooden structure. The company produced about 50 motorcycles that year.

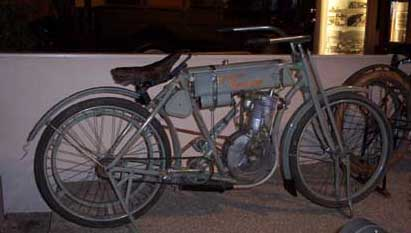
1907 model

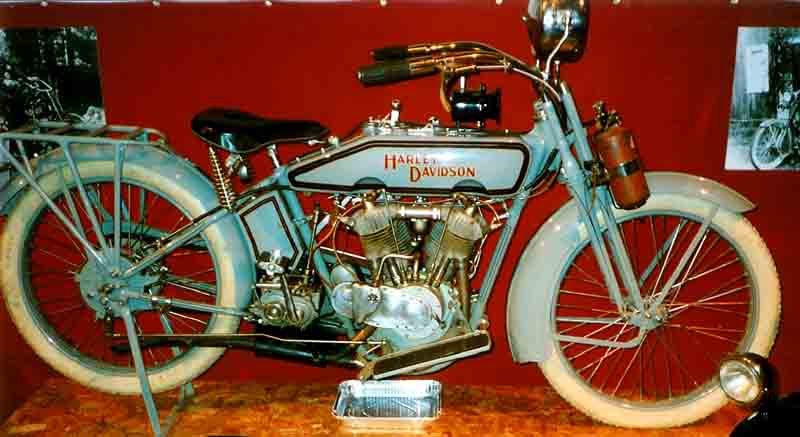
Harley-Davidson 1,000 cc HT 1916

In 1907, William S. Harley graduated from the University of Wisconsin–Madison with a degree in mechanical engineering. That year, they expanded the factory with a second floor and later with facings and additions of Milwaukee pale yellow ("cream") brick. With the new facilities, production increased to 150 motorcycles in 1907. The company was officially incorporated that September. They also began selling their motorcycles to police departments around this time, a market that has been important to them ever since. In 1907, William A. Davidson quit his job as tool foreman for the Milwaukee Road railroad and joined the Motor Company.

Production in 1905 and 1906 were all single-cylinder models with 26.84-cubic-inch (440 cc) engines. In February 1907, they displayed a prototype model at the Chicago Automobile Show with a 45-degree V-Twin engine. Very few V-Twin models were built between 1907 and 1910. These first V-Twins displaced 53.68 cubic inches (880 cc) and produced about 7 horsepower (5.2 kW). This gave about double the power of the first singles, and top speed was about 60 mph (100 km/h). Production jumped from 450 motorcycles in 1908 to 1,149 machines in 1909.

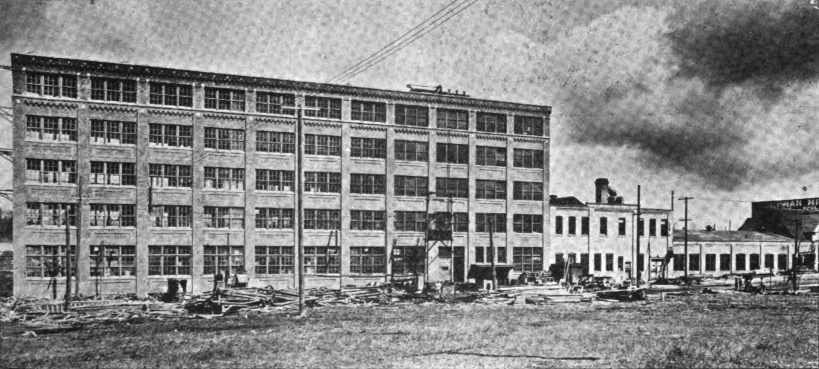
Harley-Davidson works in 1911

In 1911, the company introduced an improved V-Twin model with a displacement of 49.48 cubic inches (811 cc) and mechanically operated intake valves, as opposed to the "automatic" intake valves used on earlier V-Twins that opened by engine vacuum. It was smaller than earlier twins but gave better performance. After 1913, the majority of bikes produced by Harley-Davidson were V-Twin models.

In 1912, Harley-Davidson introduced their patented "Ful-Floteing Seat", which was suspended by a coil spring inside the seat tube. The spring tension could be adjusted to suit the rider's weight, and more than 3 inches (76 mm) of travel was available. Harley-Davidson used seats of this type until 1958.

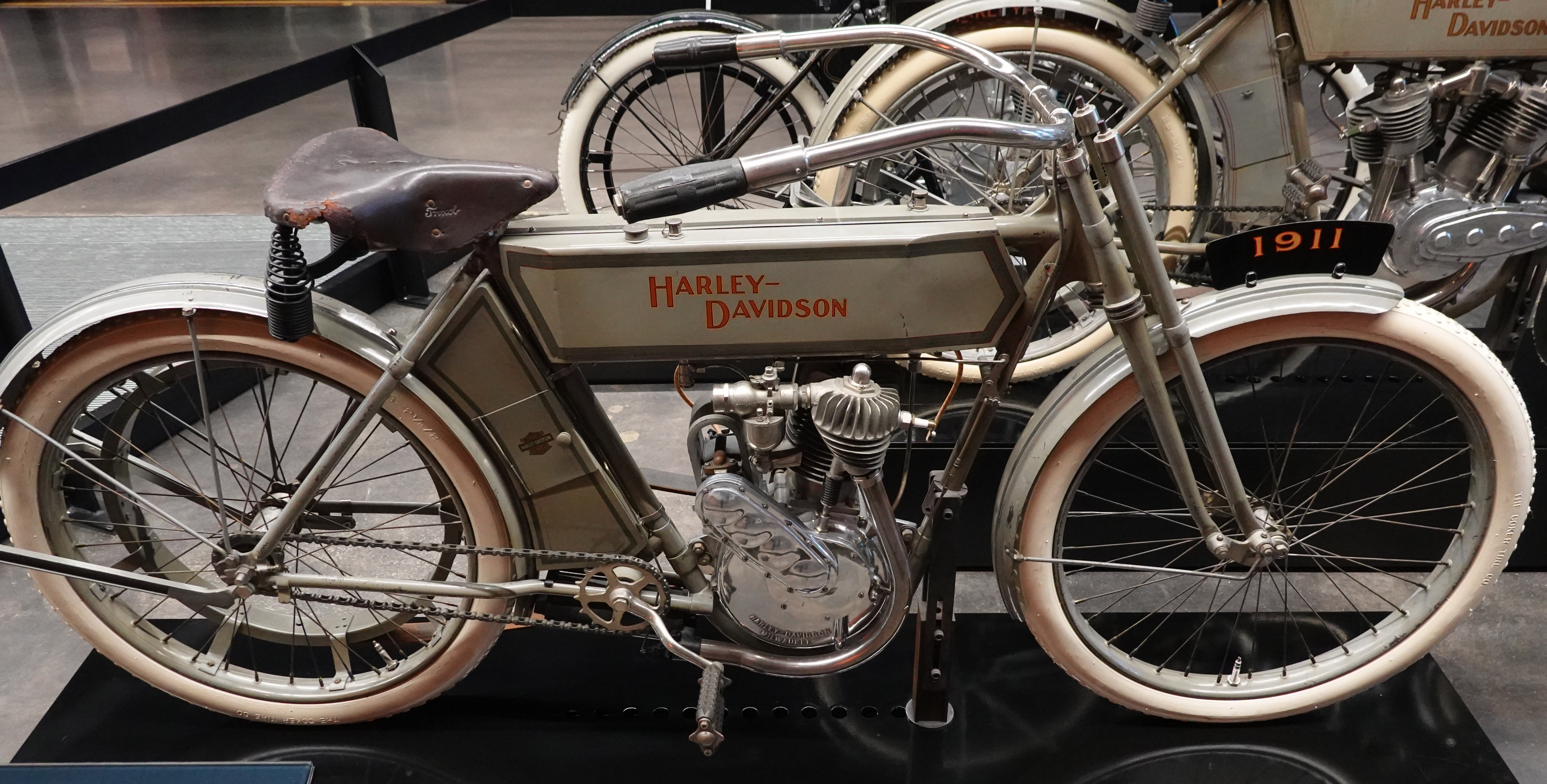
1911 Harley-Davidson "Silent Gray Fellow," on display at the Harley-Davidson Museum, Milwaukee, Wisconsin. The motorcycle featured many encased moving parts and was quiet for its day.

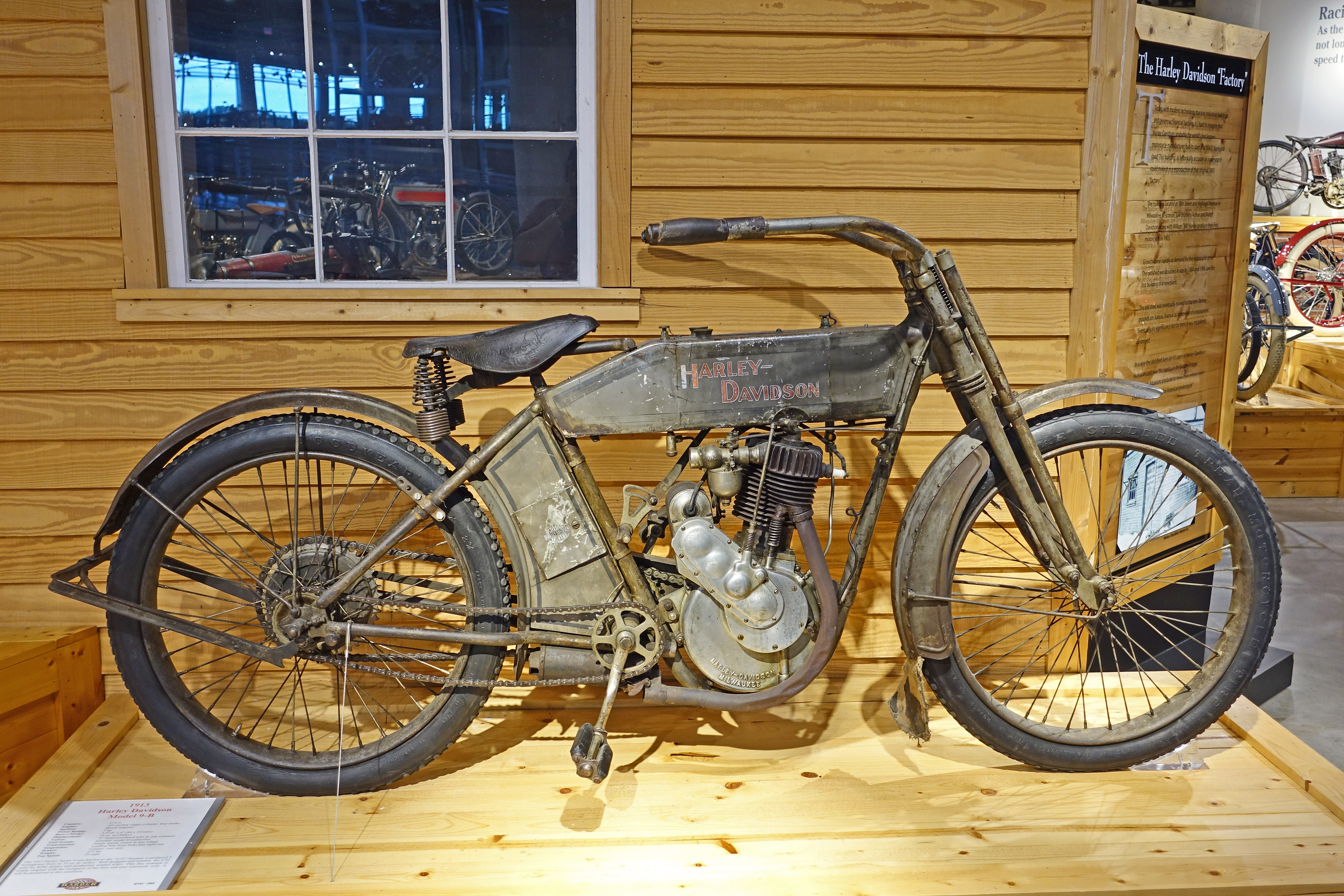
1913 Harley Davidson Model 9-B on display at the Barber Vintage Motorsports Museum, Birmingham, Alabama. The single-cylinder motorcycle had a displacement of 560cc, weighed 275 pounds, and had a top speed of 55 mph.

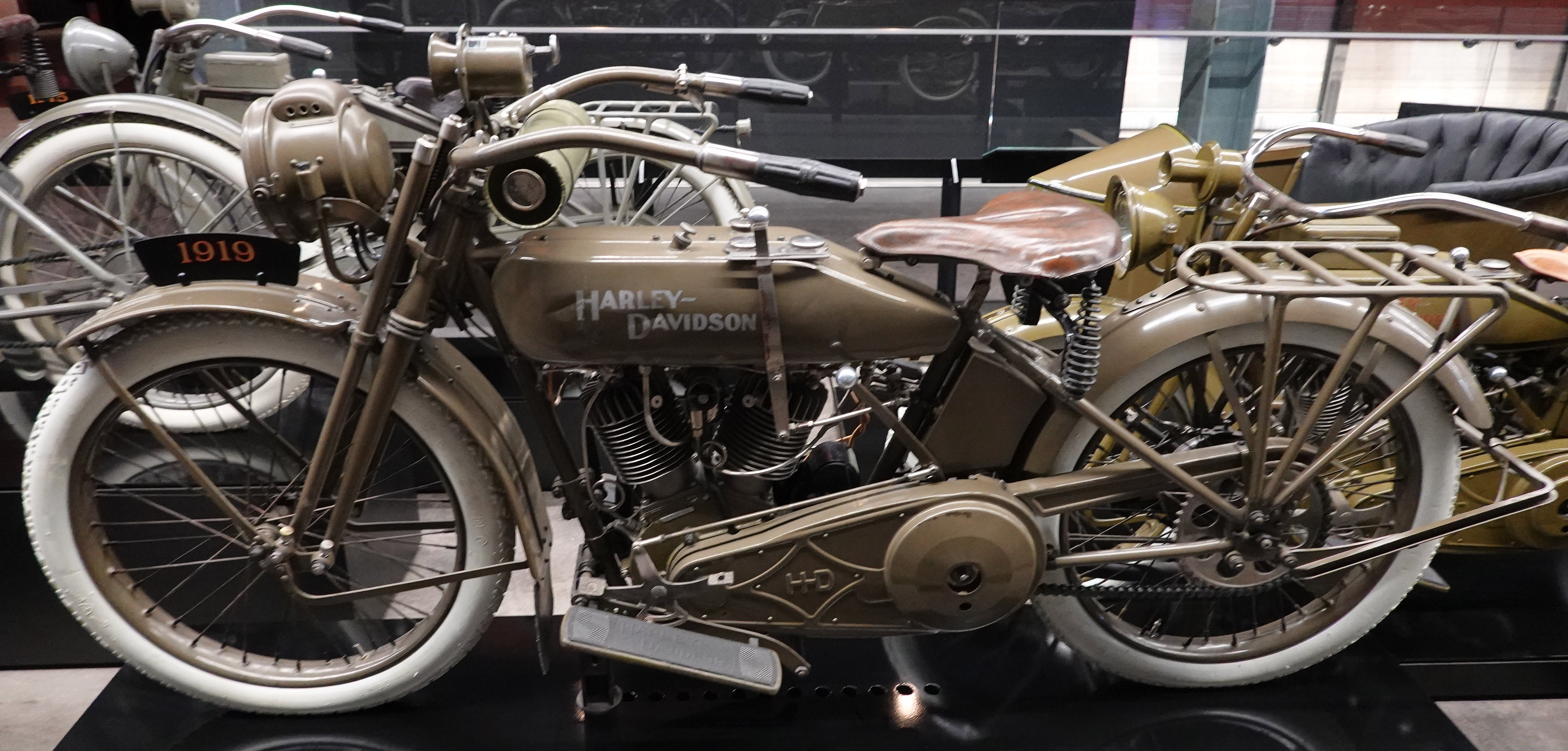
1919 Harley-Davidson military model made for the U.S. Army, on display at the Harley-Davidson Museum, Milwaukee, Wisconsin.

By 1913, the yellow brick factory had been demolished and a new five-story structure had been built on the site which took up two blocks along Juneau Avenue and around the corner on 38th Street. Despite the competition, Harley-Davidson was already pulling ahead of Indian and dominated motorcycle racing after 1914. Production that year swelled to 16,284 machines.

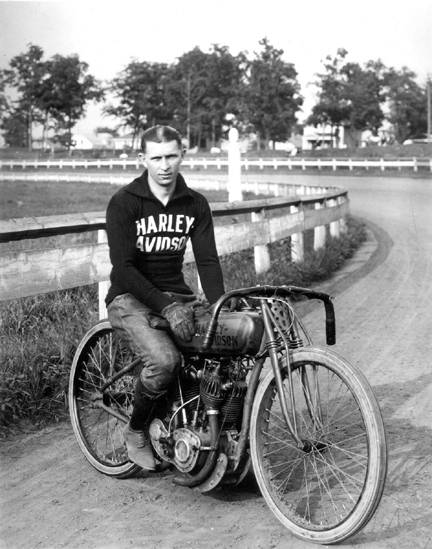
Ralph Hepburn on his Harley racing bike in 1919

=== World War I ===
In 1917, the United States entered World War I and the military demanded motorcycles for the war effort. Harleys had already been used by the military in the Pancho Villa Expedition but World War I was the first time that it was adopted for military issue, first with the British Model H produced by Triumph Engineering Co Ltd in 1915. The U.S. military purchased over 20,000 motorcycles from Harley-Davidson.

Harley-Davidson launched a line of bicycles in 1917 in hopes of recruiting more domestic customers for its motorcycles. Models included the traditional diamond frame men's bicycle, a step-through frame 3–18 "Ladies Standard", and a 5–17 "Boy Scout" for youth. The effort was discontinued in 1923 because of disappointing sales. The bicycles were built for Harley-Davidson in Dayton, Ohio by the Davis Machine Company from 1917 to 1921, when Davis stopped manufacturing bicycles.

=== 1920s ===
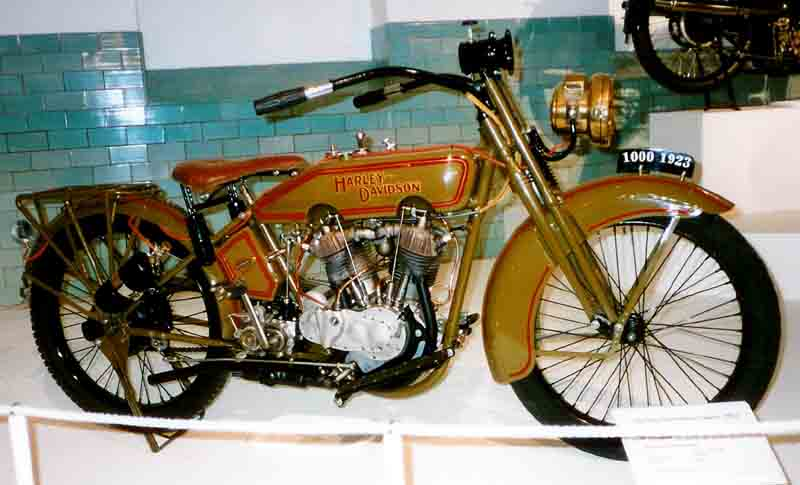
Harley-Davidson 1000 cc HT 1923

By 1920 Harley-Davidson was the largest motorcycle manufacturer in the world, with 28,189 machines produced and dealers in 67 countries. In 1921, Otto Walker set a record on a Harley-Davidson as the first motorcycle to win a race at an average speed greater than 100 mph (160 km/h).

Harley-Davidson put several improvements in place during the 1920s, such as a new 74 cubic inch (1,212.6 cc) V-Twin introduced in 1921, and the "teardrop" gas tank in 1925. They added a front brake in 1928, although only on the J/JD models. In the late summer of 1929, Harley-Davidson introduced its 45-cubic-inch (737 cc) flathead V-Twin to compete with the Indian 101 Scout and the Excelsior Super X. This was the "D" model produced from 1929 to 1931. Riders of Indian motorcycles derisively referred to it as the "three cylinder Harley" because the generator was upright and parallel to the front cylinder. In 1929, Vivian Bales drove a record 5,000 miles across the United States and Canada on a D-model.

=== Great Depression ===
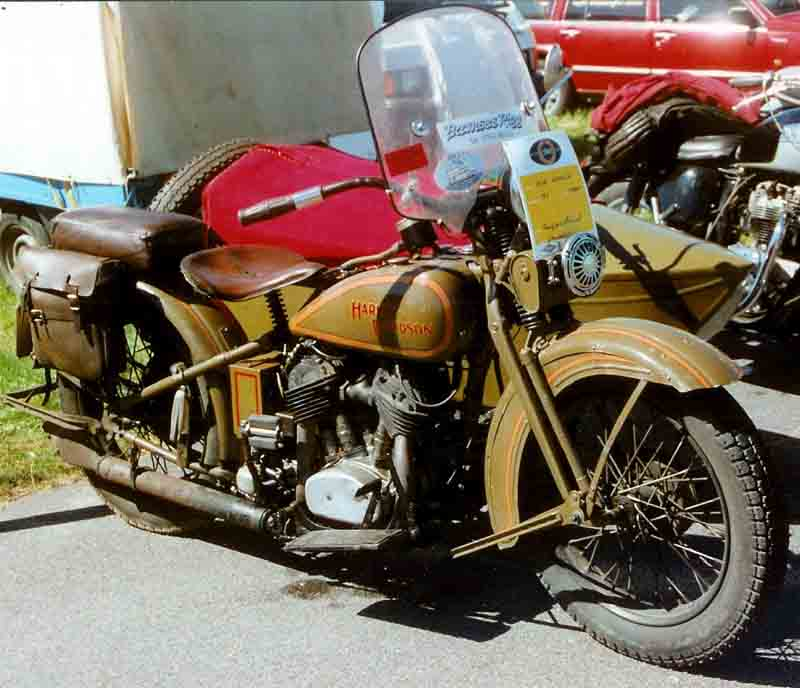
Harley-Davidson 1,200 cc SV 1931

The Great Depression began a few months after the introduction of their 45 cu in (740 cm^{3}) model. Harley-Davidson's sales fell from 21,000 in 1929 to 3,703 in 1933. Despite this, Harley-Davidson unveiled a new lineup for 1934, which included a flathead engine and Art Deco styling.

In order to survive the remainder of the Depression, the company manufactured industrial powerplants based on their motorcycle engines. They also designed and built a three-wheeled delivery vehicle called the Servi-Car, which remained in production until 1973.

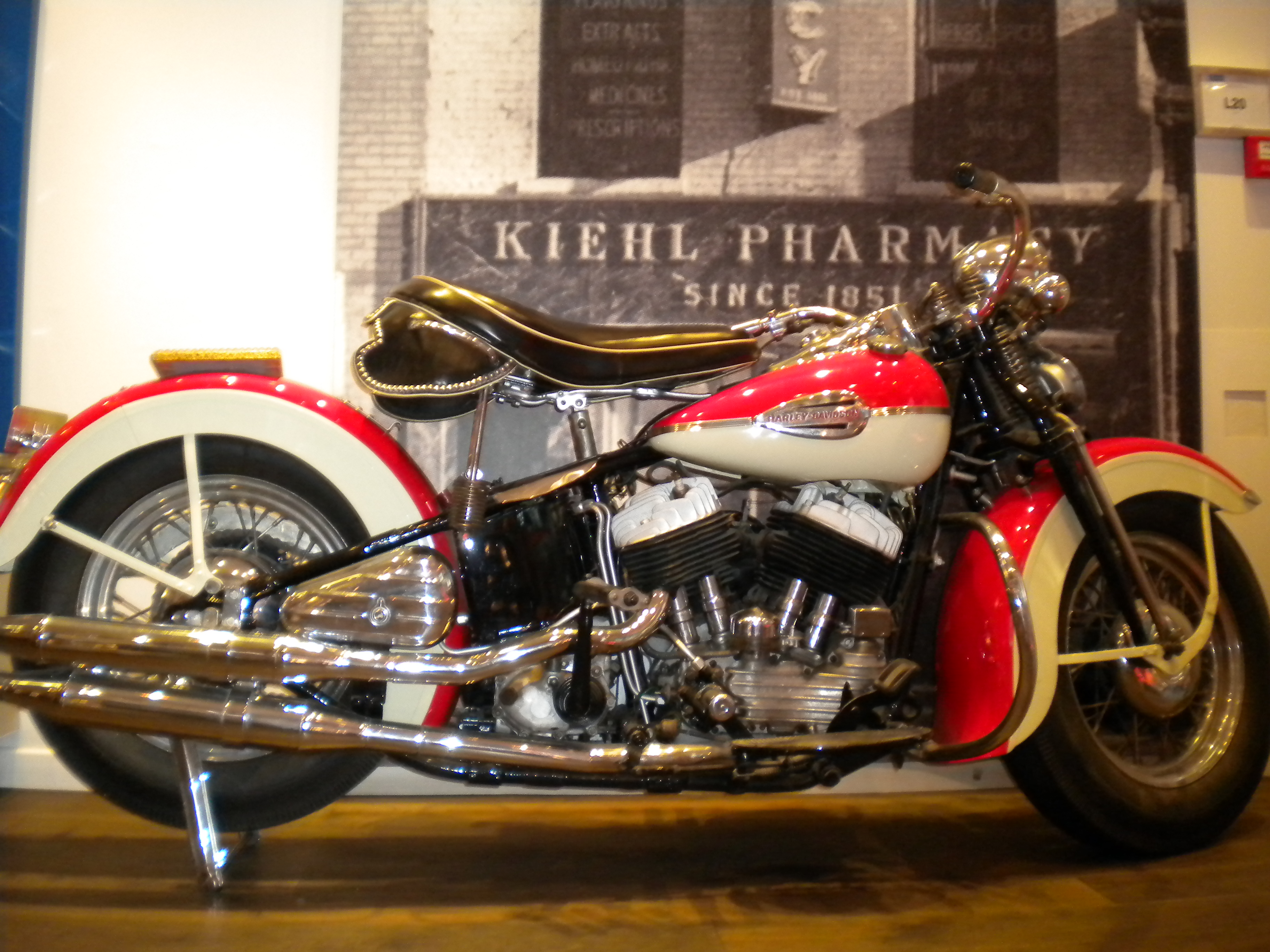
Harley-Davidson UL

Alfred Rich Child opened a production line in Japan in the mid-1930s with the 74 cu in (1,210 cm^{3}) VL. The Japanese license-holder, Sankyo Seiyaku Corporation, severed its business relations with Harley-Davidson in 1936 and continued manufacturing the VL under the Rikuo name.

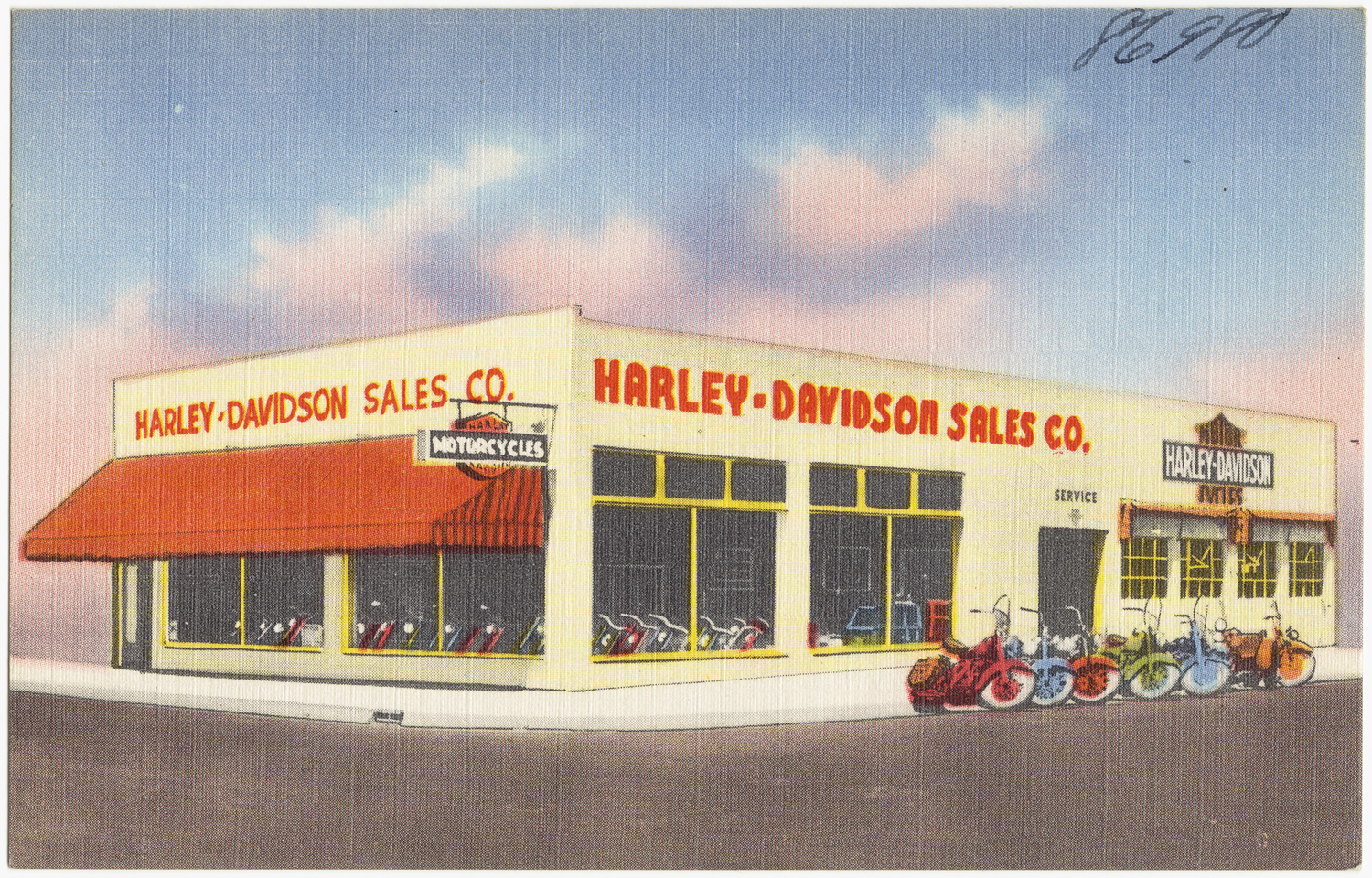
Harley-Davidson dealer in Texas, ca. 1930–1945

An 80 cubic inches (1,300 cm^{3}) flathead engine was added to the line in 1935, by which time the single-cylinder motorcycles had been discontinued.

In 1936, the 61E and 61EL models with the "Knucklehead" OHV engines were introduced. Valvetrain problems in early Knucklehead engines required a redesign halfway through its first year of production and retrofitting of the new valvetrain on earlier engines.

By 1937, all Harley-Davidson flathead engines were equipped with dry-sump oil recirculation systems similar to the one introduced in the "Knucklehead" OHV engine. The revised 74 cubic inches (1,210 cm^{3}) V and VL models were renamed U and UL, the 80 cu in (1,300 cm^{3}) VH and VLH to be renamed UH and ULH, and the 45 cu in (740 cm^{3}) R to be renamed W.

In 1941, the 74-cubic-inch "Knucklehead" was introduced as the F and the FL. The 80 cu in (1,300 cm^{3}) flathead UH and ULH models were discontinued after 1941, while the 74-cubic-inchU & UL flathead models were produced up to 1948.

=== World War II ===
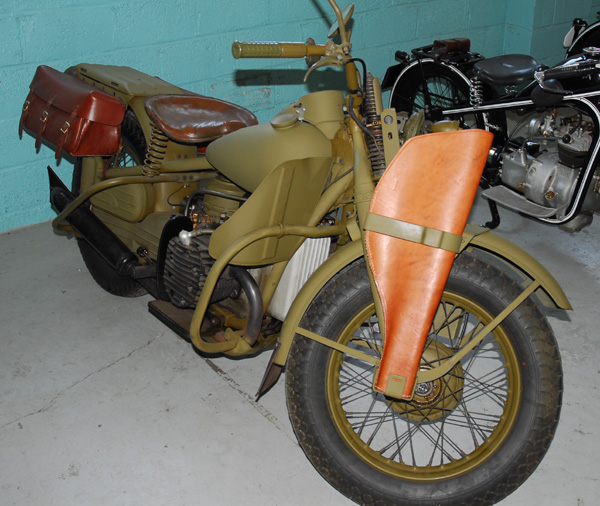
Harley copied the BMW R71 to produce its XA model.

One of only two American motorcycle manufacturers to survive the Great Depression (the other being the Indian Motorcycle Manufacturing Company), Harley-Davidson again produced large numbers of motorcycles for the US Army in World War II and resumed civilian production afterwards, producing a range of large V-twin motorcycles that were successful both on racetracks and for private buyers.

Harley-Davidson, on the eve of World War II, was already supplying the Army with a military-specific version of its 45 cubic inches (740 cm^{3}) WL line, called the WLA. The A in this case stood for "Army". Upon the outbreak of war, the company, along with most other manufacturing enterprises, shifted to war work. Some 90,000 military motorcycles, mostly WLAs and WLCs (the Canadian version) were produced, many to be provided to allies. Harley-Davidson received two Army-Navy "E" Awards, one in 1943 and the other in 1945, which were awarded for Excellence in Production.

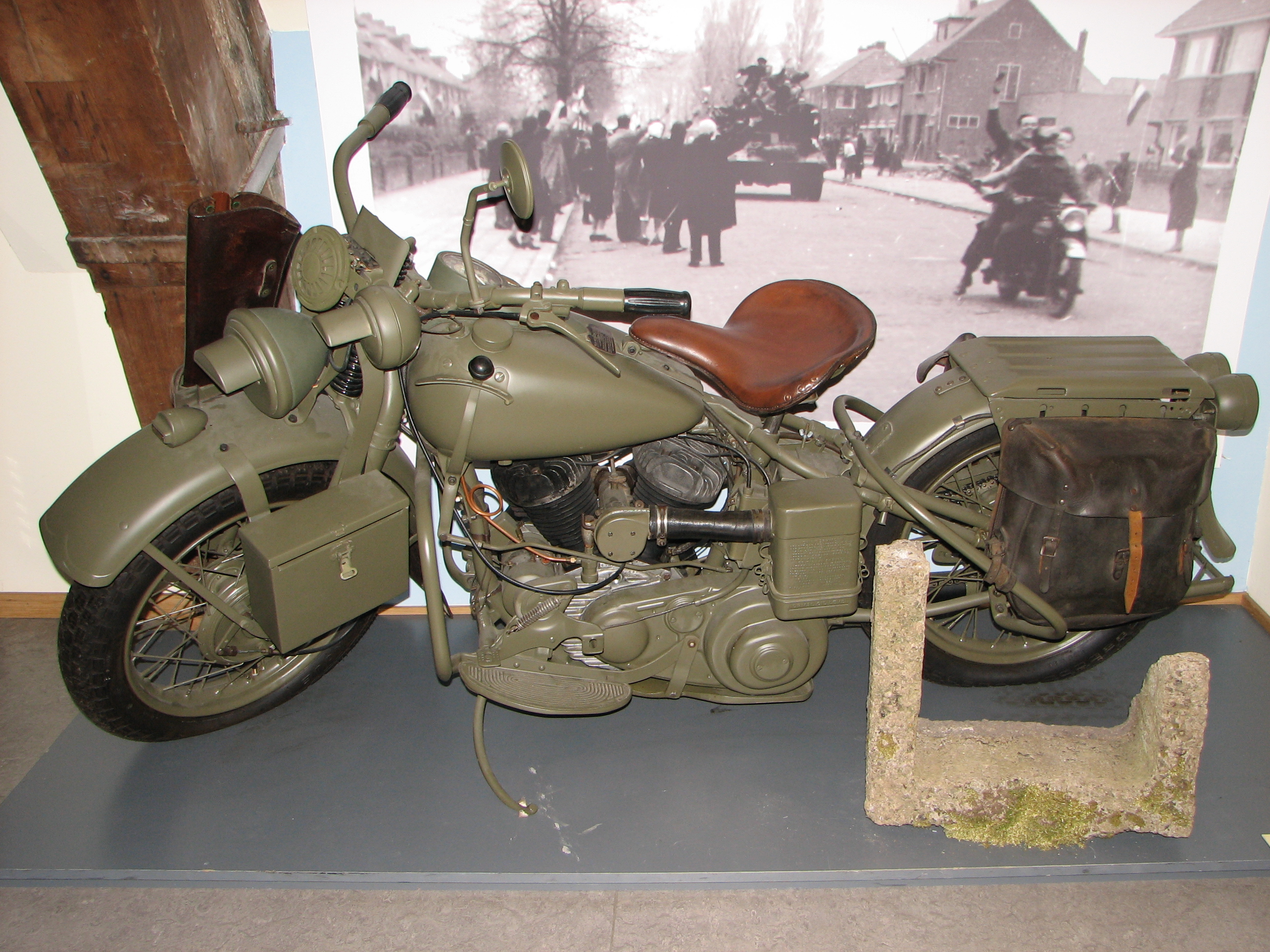
Harley-Davidson produced the WLC for the Canadian military.

Shipments to the Soviet Union under the Lend-Lease program numbered at least 30,000. The WLAs produced during all four years of war production generally have 1942 serial numbers. Production of the WLA stopped at the end of World War II, but was resumed from 1949 to 1952 for use in the Korean War.

The U.S. Army also asked Harley-Davidson to produce a new motorcycle with many of the features of BMW's side-valve and shaft-driven R71. Harley-Davidson largely copied the BMW engine and drive train and produced the shaft-driven 750 cc 1942 and '43 Harley-Davidson XA. This shared no dimensions, no parts or no design concepts (except side valves) with any prior Harley-Davidson engine. Due to the superior cooling of the flat-twin engine with the cylinders across the frame, Harley's XA cylinder heads ran 100 °F (56 °C) cooler than its V-twins. The XA never entered full production: the motorcycle by that time had been eclipsed by the Jeep as the Army's general-purpose vehicle, and the WLA – already in production – was sufficient for its limited police, escort, and courier roles. As a result, only about 1,000 were made.

=== Small: Hummer, Sportcycle and Aermacchi ===
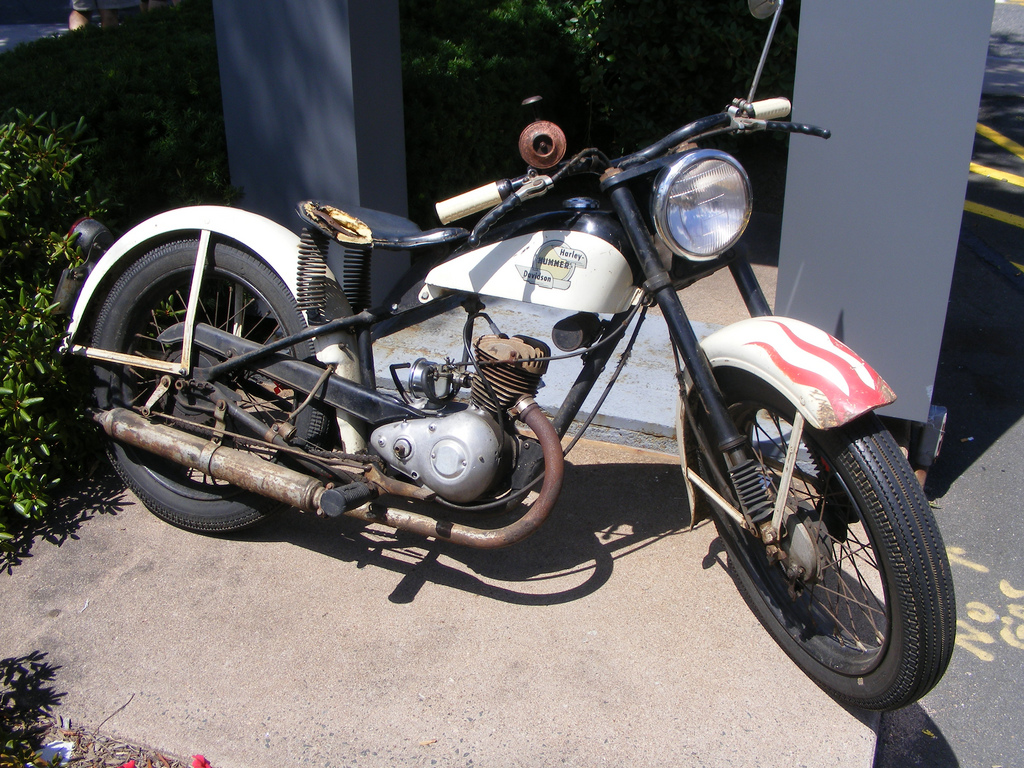
Harley-Davidson Hummer

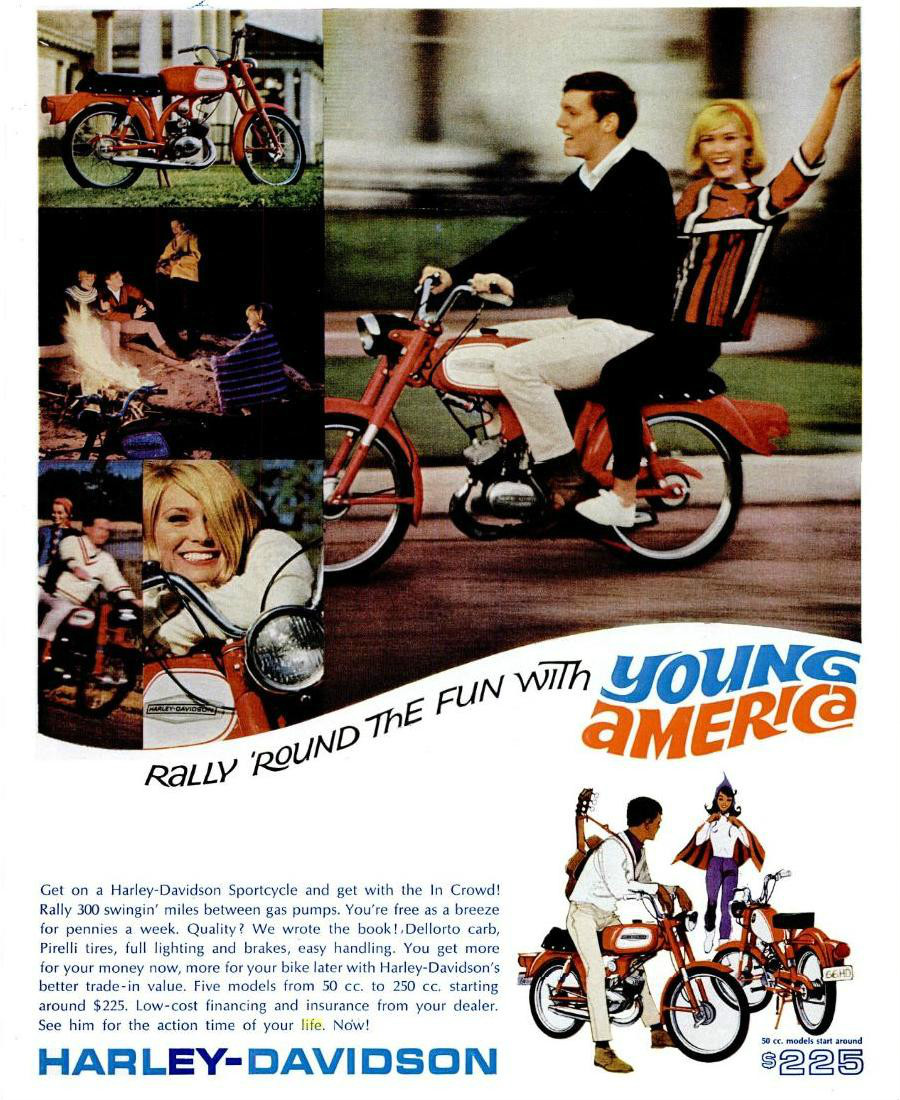
Sportcycle, 1966 "Young America" advertising campaign

As part of war reparations, Harley-Davidson acquired the design of a small German motorcycle, the DKW RT 125, which they adapted, manufactured, and sold from 1948 to 1966. Various models were made, including the Hummer from 1955 to 1959, but they are all colloquially referred to as "Hummers" at present. BSA in the United Kingdom took the same design as the foundation of their BSA Bantam.

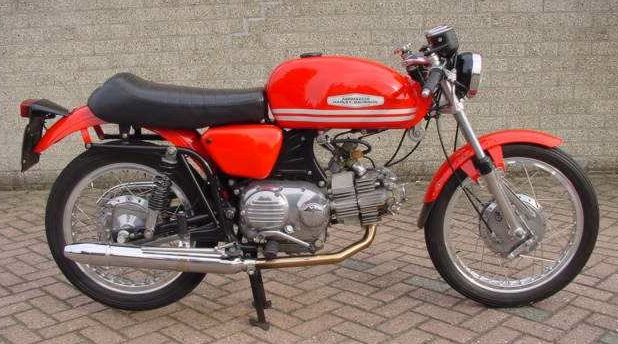
1971 Aermacchi Harley-Davidson Turismo Veloce

In 1960, Harley-Davidson consolidated the Model 165 and Hummer lines into the Super-10, introduced the Topper scooter, and bought fifty percent of Aermacchi's motorcycle division. Importation of Aermacchi's 250 cc horizontal single began the following year. The bike bore Harley-Davidson badges and was marketed as the Harley-Davidson Sprint. The engine of the Sprint was increased to 350 cc in 1969 and would remain that size until 1974, when the four-stroke Sprint was discontinued.

After the Pacer and Scat models were discontinued at the end of 1965, the Bobcat became the last of Harley-Davidson's American-made two-stroke motorcycles. The Bobcat was manufactured only in the 1966 model year.

Harley-Davidson replaced their American-made lightweight two-stroke motorcycles with the Italian Aermacchi-built two-stroke powered M-65, M-65S, and Rapido. The M-65 had a semi-step-through frame and tank. The M-65S was a M-65 with a larger tank that eliminated the step-through feature. The Rapido was a larger bike with a 125 cc engine. The Aermacchi-built Harley-Davidsons became entirely two-stroke powered when the 250 cc two-stroke SS-250 replaced the four-stroke 350 cc Sprint in 1974.

Harley-Davidson purchased full control of Aermacchi's motorcycle production in 1974 and continued making two-stroke motorcycles there until 1978, when they sold the facility to Cagiva, owned by the Castiglioni family.

=== Tarnished reputation ===
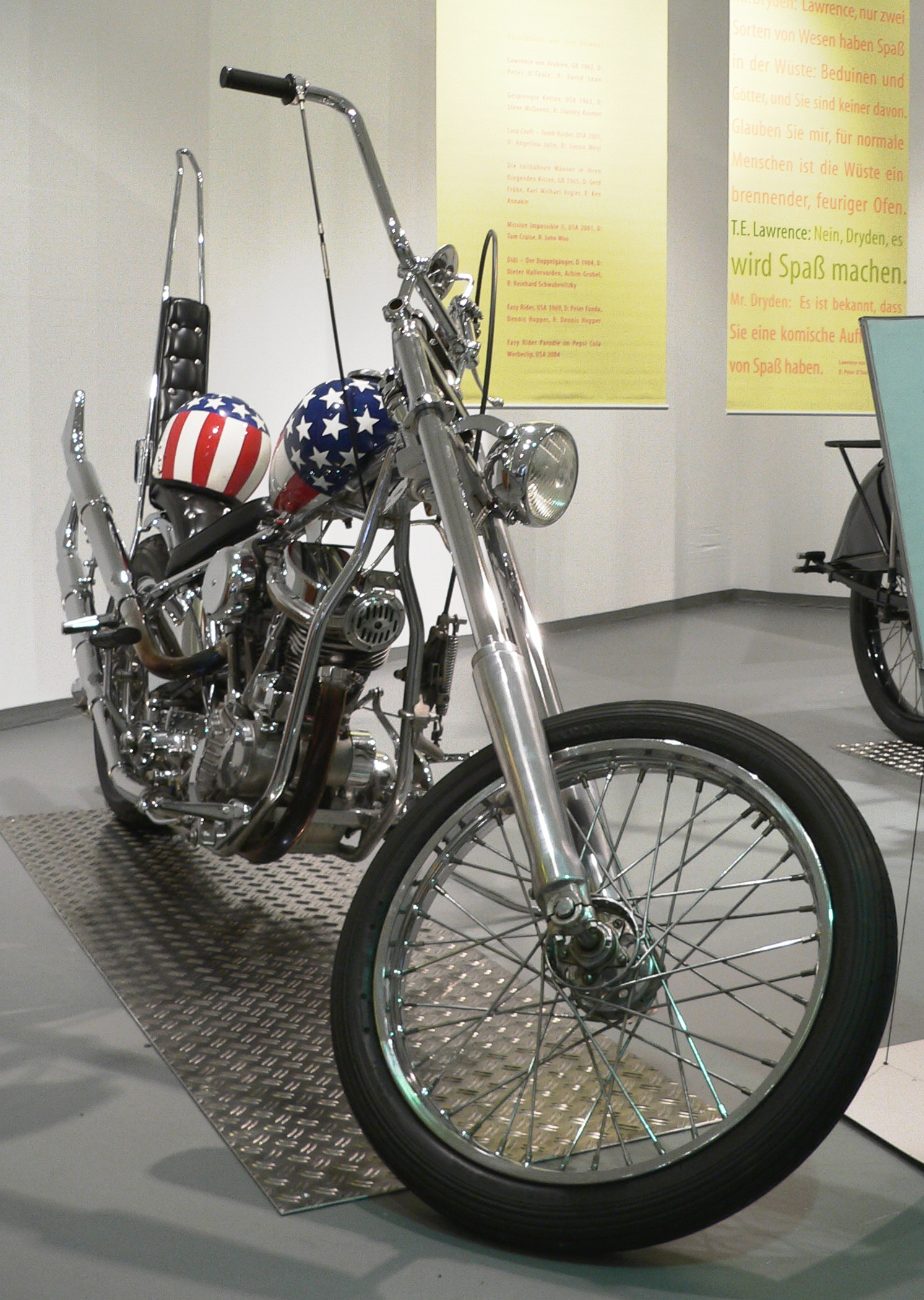
Replica of the "Captain America bike" from the film Easy Rider

In 1952, following their application to the U.S. Tariff Commission for a 40 percent tax on imported motorcycles, Harley-Davidson was charged with restrictive practices.

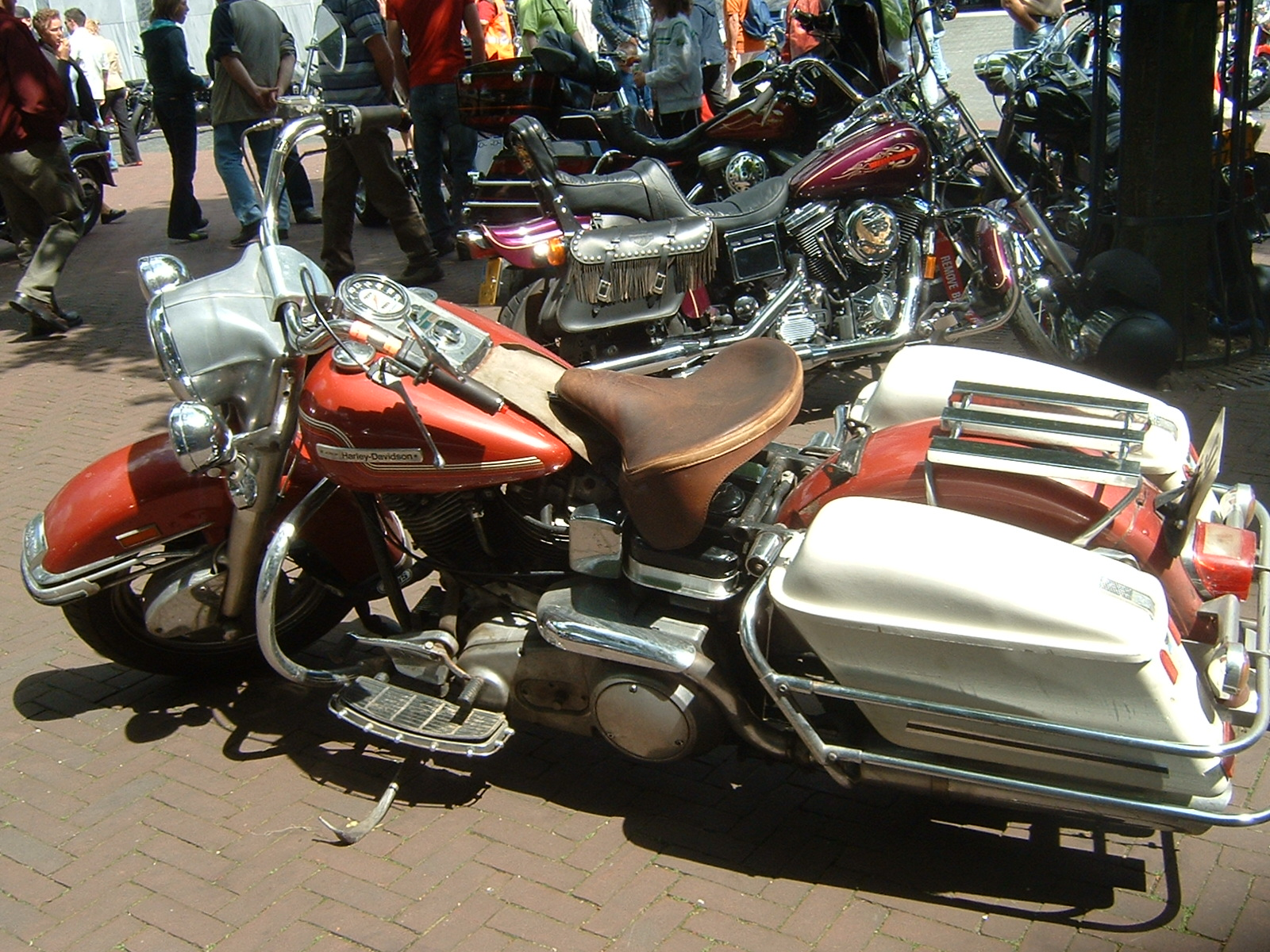
AMF H-D Electra Glide

In 1969, American Machine and Foundry (AMF) bought the company, streamlined production, and slashed the workforce. This tactic resulted in a labor strike and cost-cutting produced lower-quality bikes. Simultaneously, the Japanese "big four" manufacturers (Honda, Kawasaki, Suzuki, and Yamaha) revolutionized the North American market by introducing what the motoring press would call the Universal Japanese Motorcycle. In comparison, Harley-Davidson's bikes were expensive and inferior in performance, handling, and quality. Sales and quality declined, and the company almost went bankrupt. The "Harley-Davidson" name was mocked as "Hardly Ableson", "Hardly Driveable", and "Hogly Ferguson", and the nickname "Hog" became pejorative.

In 1977, following the successful manufacture of the Liberty Edition to commemorate America's bicentennial in 1976, Harley-Davidson produced what has become one of its most controversial models, the Harley-Davidson Confederate Edition. The bike was essentially a stock Harley-Davidson with Confederate-specific paint and details.

=== Restructuring and revival ===
In 1981, AMF sold the company to a group of 13 investors led by Vaughn Beals and Willie G. Davidson for $80 million. The new management team improved product quality, introduced new technologies, and adopted just-in-time inventory management. These operational and product improvements were matched with a strategy of seeking tariff protection for large-displacement motorcycles in the face of intense competition with Japanese manufacturers. These protections were granted by the Reagan administration in 1983, giving Harley-Davidson time to implement their new strategies.

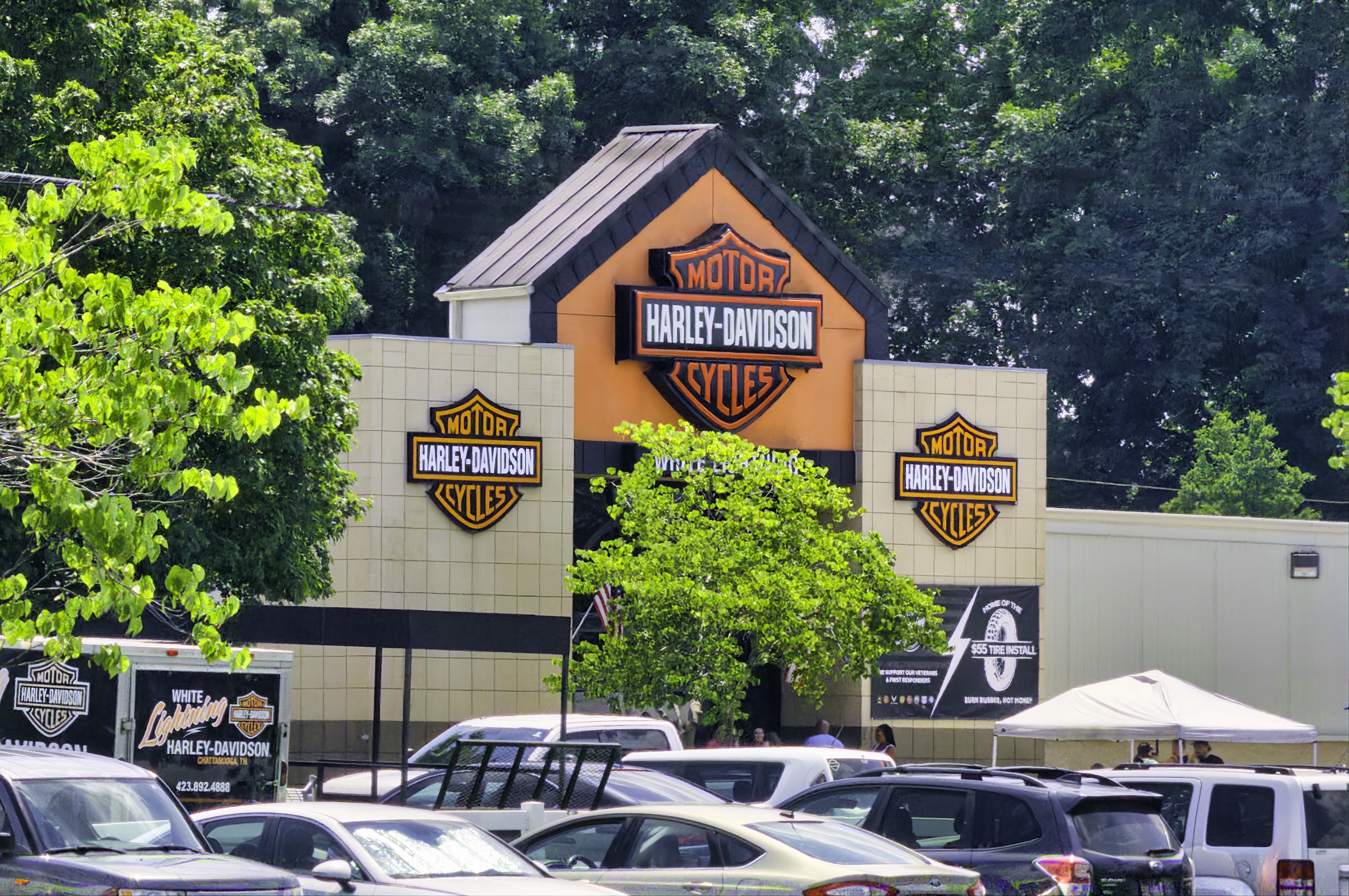
A modern Harley-Davidson dealer in Chattanooga, Tennessee

Revising stagnated product designs was a crucial centerpiece of Harley-Davidson's turnaround strategy. Rather than trying to mimic popular Japanese designs, the new management deliberately exploited the "retro" appeal of Harley motorcycles, building machines that deliberately adopted the look and feel of their earlier bikes and the subsequent customizations of owners of that era. Many components such as brakes, forks, shocks, carburetors, electrics and wheels were outsourced from foreign manufacturers and quality increased, technical improvements were made, and buyers slowly returned.

Harley-Davidson bought the "Sub Shock" cantilever-swingarm rear suspension design from Missouri engineer Bill Davis and developed it into its Softail series of motorcycles, introduced in 1984 with the FXST Softail.

In response to possible motorcycle market loss due to the aging of baby-boomers, Harley-Davidson bought luxury motorhome manufacturer Holiday Rambler in 1986. In 1996, the company sold Holiday Rambler to the Monaco Coach Corporation.

The "Sturgis" model, boasting a dual belt-drive, was introduced initially in 1980 and was made for three years. This bike was then brought back as a commemorative model in 1991.

=== Fat Boy, Dyna, and Harley-Davidson museum ===
By 1990, with the introduction of the "Fat Boy", Harley-Davidson once again became the sales leader in the heavyweight (over 750 cc) market. At the time of the Fat Boy model introduction, a false etymology spread that "Fat Boy" was a combination of the names of the atomic bombs Fat Man and Little Boy. This has been debunked, as the name "Fat Boy" actually comes from the observation that the motorcycle is somewhat wider than other bikes when viewed head-on.

1993 and 1994 saw the replacement of FXR models with the Dyna (FXD), which became the sole rubber mount FX Big Twin frame in 1994. The FXR was revived briefly from 1999 to 2000 for special limited editions (FXR^{2}, FXR^{3} & FXR^{4}).

Harley-Davidson celebrated their 100th anniversary on September 1, 2003 with a large event and concert featuring performances from Elton John, The Doobie Brothers, Kid Rock, and Tim McGraw.

Construction started on the $75 million, 130,000 square-foot (12,000 m^{2}) Harley-Davidson Museum in the Menomonee Valley of Milwaukee, Wisconsin on June 1, 2006. It opened in 2008 and houses the company's vast collection of historic motorcycles and corporate archives, along with a restaurant, café and meeting space.

=== Overseas operations ===
Established in 1918, the oldest continuously operating Harley-Davidson dealership outside of the United States is in Australia. Sales in Japan started in 1912 then in 1929, Harley-Davidsons were produced in Japan under license to the company Rikuo (Rikuo Internal Combustion Company) under the name of Harley-Davidson and using the company's tooling, and later under the name Rikuo. Production continued until 1958.

In 1998, the first Harley-Davidson factory outside the US opened in Manaus, Brazil, taking advantage of the free economic zone there. The location was positioned to sell motorcycles in the southern hemisphere market.

In August 2009, Harley-Davidson launched Harley-Davidson India and started selling motorcycles there in 2010. The company established the subsidiary in Gurgaon, near Delhi, in 2011 and created an Indian dealer network. On September 24, 2020, Harley Davidson announced that it would discontinue its sales and manufacturing operations in India due to weak demand and sales. The move involves $75 million in restructuring costs, 70 layoffs and the closure of its Bawal plant in northern India.

=== Buell Motorcycle Company ===
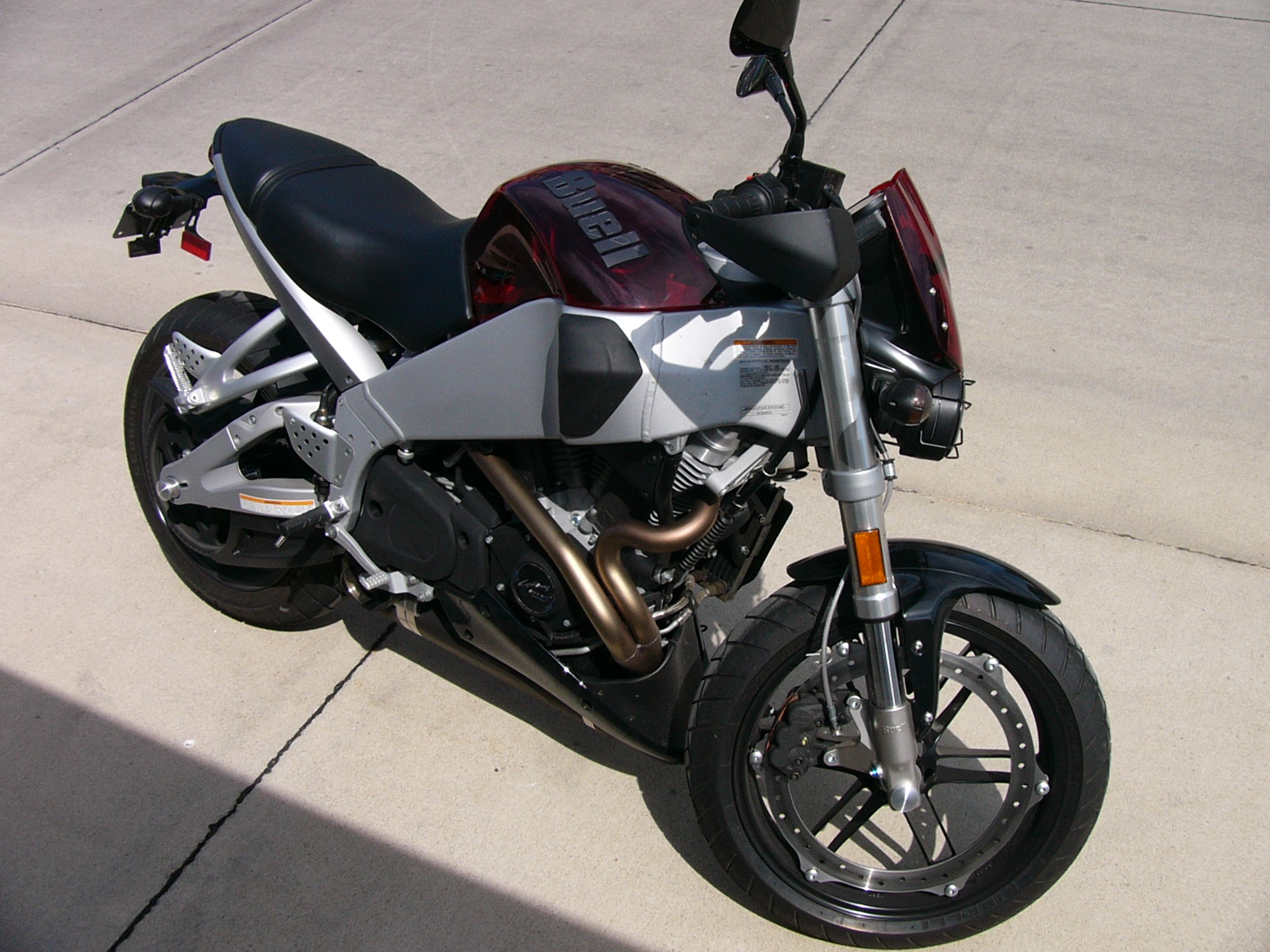
Buell Lightning XB9SX

Harley-Davidson's association with sportbike manufacturer Buell Motorcycle Company began in 1987 when they supplied Buell with fifty surplus XR1000 engines. Buell continued to buy engines from Harley-Davidson until 1993, when Harley-Davidson bought 49 percent of the Buell Motorcycle Company. Harley-Davidson increased its share in Buell to ninety-eight percent in 1998, and to complete ownership in 2003.

In an attempt to attract newcomers to motorcycling in general and to Harley-Davidson in particular, Buell developed a low-cost, low-maintenance motorcycle. The resulting single-cylinder Buell Blast was introduced in 2000, and was made through 2009, which, according to Buell, was to be the final year of production. The Buell Blast was the training vehicle for the Harley-Davidson Rider's Edge New Rider Course from 2000 until May 2014, when the company re-branded the training academy and started using the Harley-Davidson Street 500 motorcycles. In those 14 years, more than 350,000 participants in the course learned to ride on the Buell Blast.

On October 15, 2009, Harley-Davidson Inc. issued an official statement that it would be discontinuing the Buell line and ceasing production immediately, in order to focus on the Harley-Davidson brand. The company refused to consider selling Buell. Founder Erik Buell subsequently established Erik Buell Racing and continued to manufacture and develop the company's 1125RR racing motorcycle.

=== Claims of stock price manipulation ===
Harley-Davidson, Inc. (NYSE:HOG) stock price (source: ZenoBank.com)

During its period of peak demand, during the late 1990s and early first decade of the 21st century, Harley-Davidson embarked on a program of expanding the number of dealerships throughout the country. At the same time, its current dealers typically had waiting lists that extended up to a year for some of the most popular models. Harley-Davidson, like the auto manufacturers, records a sale not when a consumer buys their product, but rather when it is delivered to a dealer. Therefore, it is possible for the manufacturer to inflate sales numbers by requiring dealers to accept more inventory than desired in a practice called channel stuffing. When demand softened following the unique 2003 model year, this news led to a dramatic decline in the stock price. In April 2004 alone, the price of HOG shares dropped from more than $60 to less than $40. Immediately prior to this decline, retiring CEO Jeffrey Bleustein profited $42 million on the exercise of employee stock options. Harley-Davidson was named as a defendant in numerous class action suits filed by investors who claimed they were intentionally defrauded by Harley-Davidson's management and directors. By January 2007, the price of Harley-Davidson shares reached $70.

=== Problems with Police Touring models ===
Starting around 2000, several police departments started reporting problems with high-speed instability on the Harley-Davidson Touring motorcycles. A Raleigh, North Carolina police officer, Charles Paul, was killed when his 2002 police touring motorcycle crashed after reportedly experiencing a high-speed wobble. The California Highway Patrol conducted testing of the Police Touring motorcycles in 2006. The CHP test riders reported experiencing wobble or weave instability while operating the motorcycles on the test track.

=== 2007 strike ===
On February 2, 2007, upon the expiration of their union contract, about 2,700 employees at Harley-Davidson Inc.'s largest manufacturing plant in York, Pennsylvania, went on strike after failing to agree on wages and health benefits. During the pendency of the strike, the company refused to pay for any portion of the striking employees' health care.

The day before the strike, after the union voted against the proposed contract and to authorize the strike, the company shut down all production at the plant. The York facility employs more than 3,200 workers, both union and non-union.

Harley-Davidson announced on February 16, 2007, that it had reached a labor agreement with union workers at its largest manufacturing plant, a breakthrough in the two-week-old strike. The strike disrupted Harley-Davidson's national production and was felt in Wisconsin, where 440 employees were laid off, and many Harley suppliers also laid off workers because of the strike.

=== MV Agusta Group ===
On July 11, 2008, Harley-Davidson announced they had signed a definitive agreement to acquire the MV Agusta Group for US$109 million (€70M). MV Agusta Group contains two lines of motorcycles: the high-performance MV Agusta brand and the lightweight Cagiva brand. The acquisition was completed on August 8.

On October 15, 2009, Harley-Davidson announced that it would divest its interest in MV Agusta. Harley-Davidson Inc. sold Italian motorcycle maker MV Agusta to Claudio Castiglioni – a member of the family that had purchased Aermacchi from H-D in 1978 – for a reported 3 euros, ending the transaction in the first week of August 2010. Castiglioni was MV Agusta's former owner, and had been MV Agusta's chairman since Harley-Davidson bought it in 2008. As part of the deal, Harley-Davidson put $26M into MV Agusta's accounts, essentially giving Castiglioni $26M to take the brand.

=== 2008 financial crisis ===
The 2008 financial crisis and 2008–2010 automotive industry crisis affected also the motorcycle industry. According to Interbrand, the value of the Harley-Davidson brand fell by 43 percent to $4.34 billion in 2009. The fall in value is believed to be connected to the 66 percent drop in the company profits in two-quarters of the previous year. On April 29, 2010, Harley-Davidson stated that they must cut $54 million in manufacturing costs from its production facilities in Wisconsin, and that they would explore alternative U.S. sites to accomplish this. The announcement came in the wake of a massive company-wide restructuring, which began in early 2009 and involved the closing of two factories, one distribution center, and the planned elimination of nearly 25 percent of its total workforce (around 3,500 employees). The company announced on September 14, 2010, that it would remain in Wisconsin.

=== Sale of Consumer Loan Receivables ===
On July 30, 2025, Harley-Davidson announced selling a total of 9.8% equity interest in Harley-Davidson Financial Services and more than $5 billion in consumer loan receivables to KKR & Co. and PIMCO.

== Motorcycle engines ==
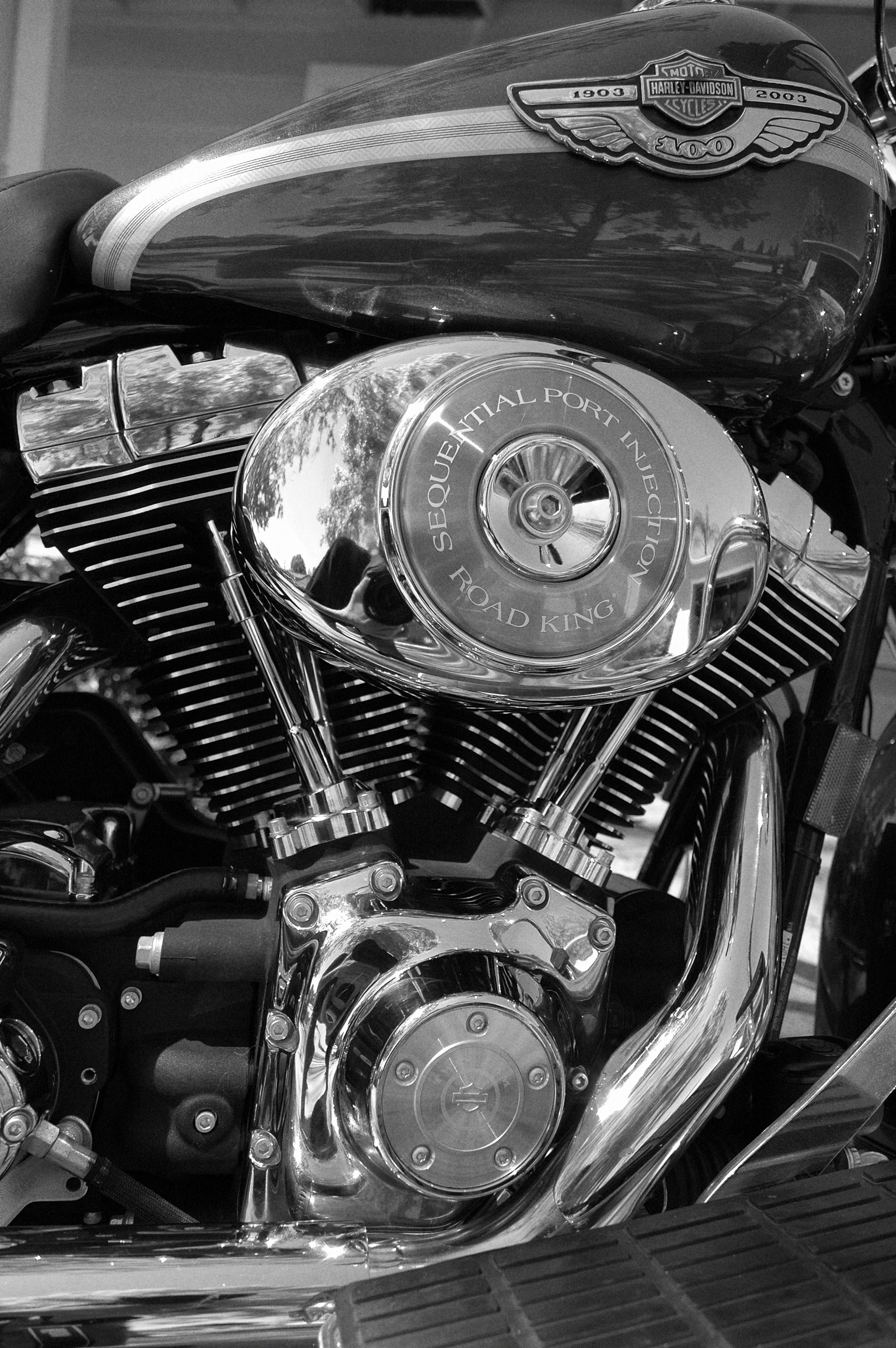
1,450 cubic centimetres (88 cu in) V-twin

The classic Harley-Davidson engines are V-twin engines, with a 45° angle between the cylinders. The crankshaft has a single pin, and both pistons are connected to this pin through their connecting rods.

This 45° angle is covered under several United States patents and is an engineering tradeoff that allows a large, high-torque engine in a relatively small space. It causes the cylinders to fire at uneven intervals and produces the choppy "potato-potato" sound so strongly linked to the Harley-Davidson brand.

To simplify the engine and reduce costs, the V-twin ignition was designed to operate with a single set of points and no distributor. This is known as a dual fire ignition system, causing both spark plugs to fire regardless of which cylinder was on its compression stroke, with the other spark plug firing on its cylinder's exhaust stroke, effectively "wasting a spark". The exhaust note is basically a throaty growling sound with some popping. The 45° design of the engine thus creates a plug firing sequencing as such: The first cylinder fires, the second (rear) cylinder fires 315° later, then there is a 405° gap until the first cylinder fires again, giving the engine its unique sound.

Harley-Davidson has used various ignition systems, including the early points and condenser system on Big Twins and Sportsters up to 1978, a magneto ignition system used on some 1958 to 1969 Sportsters, an early electronic with centrifugal mechanical advance weights on all models from mid-1978 until 1979, and a later electronic with a transistorized ignition control module (more familiarly known as a black box or a brain) on all models 1980 to present.

Starting in 1995, the company introduced Electronic Fuel Injection (EFI) as an option for the 30th anniversary edition Electra Glide. EFI became standard on all Harley-Davidson motorcycles, including Sportsters, upon the introduction of the 2007 product line.

In 1991, Harley-Davidson began to participate in the Sound Quality Working Group, founded by Orfield Labs, Bruel and Kjaer, TEAC, Yamaha, Sennheiser, SMS and Cortex. This was the nation's first group to share research on psychological acoustics. Later that year, Harley-Davidson participated in a series of sound quality studies at Orfield Labs, based on recordings taken at the Talladega Superspeedway, with the objective to lower the sound level for EU standards while analytically capturing the "Harley Sound". This research resulted in the bikes that were introduced in compliance with EU standards for 1998.

On February 1, 1994, the company filed a sound trademark application for the distinctive sound of the Harley-Davidson motorcycle engine: "The mark consists of the exhaust sound of applicant's motorcycles, produced by V-twin, common crankpin motorcycle engines when the goods are in use". Nine of Harley-Davidson's competitors filed comments opposing the application, arguing that cruiser-style motorcycles of various brands use a single-crankpin V-twin engine which produce a similar sound. These objections were followed by litigation. In June 2000, the company dropped efforts to register a sound trademark.

=== Big V-twins ===
- F-head, also known as JD, pocket valve and IOE (intake over exhaust), 1914–1929 (1,000 cc), and 1922–1929 (1,200 cc)
- Flathead, 1930–1949 (1,200 cc) and 1935–1941 (1,300 cc).
- Knucklehead, 1936–1947 61 cubic inch (1,000 cc), and 1941–1947 74 cubic inch (1,200 cc)
- Panhead, 1948–1965 61 cubic inch (1,000 cc), and 1948–1965, 74 cubic inch (1,200 cc)
- Shovelhead, 1966–1984, 74 cubic inch (1,200 cc) and 80 cubic inch (1,338 cc) since 1978
- Evolution (a.k.a. "Evo" and "Blockhead"), 1984–1999, 82 cubic inch (1,340 cc)
- Twin Cam (a.k.a. "Fathead" as named by American Iron Magazine) 1999–2017, in the following versions:
  - Twin Cam 88, 1999–2006, 88 cubic inch (1,450 cc)
  - Twin Cam 88B, counterbalanced version of the Twin Cam 88, 2000–2006, 88 cubic inch (1,450 cc)
  - Twin Cam 95, since 2000, 95 cubic inch (1,550 cc) (engines for early C.V.O. models)
  - Twin Cam 96, since 2007.
  - Twin Cam 103, 2003–2006, 2009, 103 cubic inch (1,690 cc) (engines for C.V.O. models), Standard on 2011 Touring models: Ultra Limited, Road King Classic and Road Glide Ultra and optional on the Road Glide Custom and Street Glide. Standard on most 2012 models excluding Sportsters and 2 Dynas (Street Bob and Super Glide Custom). Standard on all 2014 dyna models.
  - Twin Cam 110, 2007–2017, 110 cubic inch (1,800 cc) (engines for C.V.O. models, 2016 Soft Tail Slim S; FatBoy S, Low Rider S, and Pro-Street Breakout)
- Milwaukee-Eight
  - Standard 107 cu in (1,746 cc): Standard on touring model year 2017+ and Softail models 2018+.
  - Twin-cooled 107 cu in (1,746 cc): Optional on some touring and trike model year 2017+.
  - Twin-cooled 114 cu in (1,868 cc): Optional on touring and trike model year 2017+, standard on 2017 CVO models.
  - Twin-cooled 117 cu in (1,923 cc): Standard on 2018 CVO models

=== Small V-twins ===
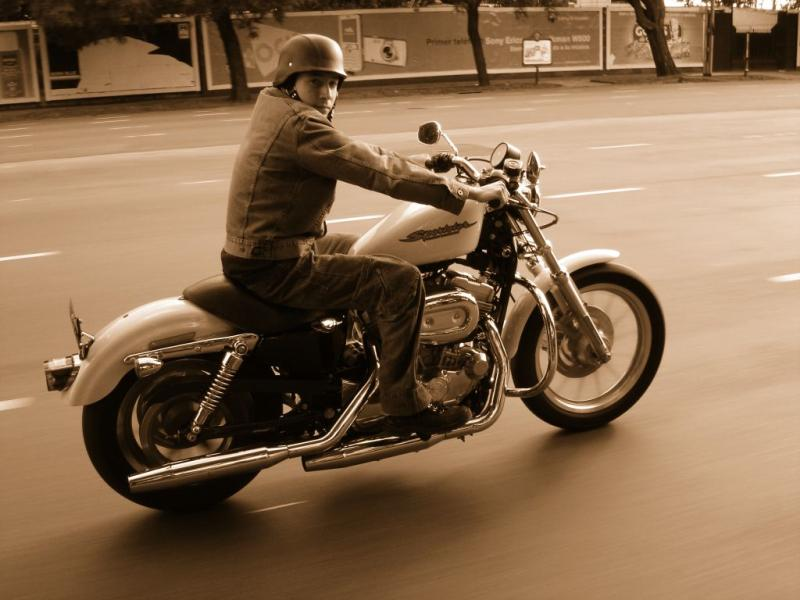
Evolution Sportster

- D Model, 1929–1931, 750 cc
- R Model, 1932–1936, 750 cc
- Flathead 750 cc
  - 1937–1952 W Model solo 2 wheel
  - 1932–1973 G Model Servi-Car three-wheeler
- K Model, 1952–1953, 750 cc
- KH Model, 1954–1956, 900 cc
- Ironhead, 1957–1971, 883 cc; 1972–1985, 1,000 cc
- Evolution, since 1986, 883 cc, 1,100 cc and 1,200 cc

=== Revolution engine ===
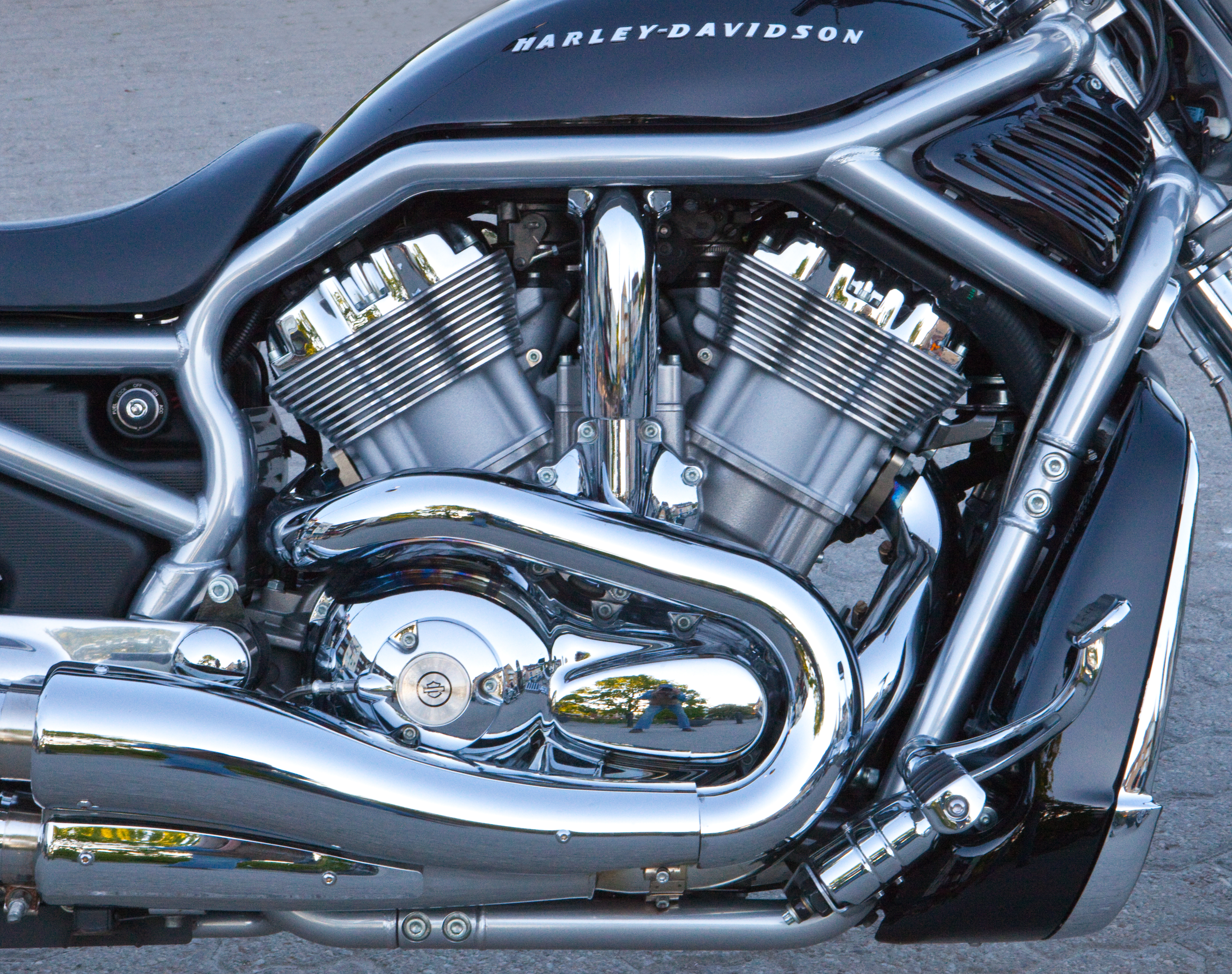
Revolution engine in V-Rod

The Revolution engine is based on the VR-1000 Superbike race program, developed by Harley-Davidson's Powertrain Engineering with Porsche helping to make the engine suitable for street use. It is a liquid cooled, dual overhead cam, internally counterbalanced 60 degree V-twin engine with a displacement of 69 cubic inch (1,130 cc), producing 115 hp (86 kW) at 8,250 rpm at the crank, with a redline of 9,000 rpm. It was introduced for the new VRSC (V-Rod) line in 2001 for the 2002 model year, starting with the single VRSCA (V-Twin Racing Street Custom) model. The Revolution marks Harley's first collaboration with Porsche since the V4 Nova project, which, like the V-Rod, was a radical departure from Harley's traditional lineup until it was cancelled by AMF in 1981 in favor of the Evolution engine.

A 1,250 cc Screamin' Eagle version of the Revolution engine was made available for 2005 and 2006, and was present thereafter in a single production model from 2005 to 2007. In 2008, the 1,250 cc Revolution Engine became standard for the entire VRSC line. Harley-Davidson claims 123 hp (92 kW) at the crank for the 2008 VRSCAW model. The VRXSE Destroyer dragbike is equipped with a stroker (75 mm crank) Screamin' Eagle 79 cubic inch (1,300 cc) Revolution Engine, producing 97 pound-feet (132 N⋅m), and more than 165 hp (123 kW).

750 cc and 500 cc versions of the Revolution engine are used in Harley-Davidson's Street line of light cruisers. These motors, named the Revolution X, use a single overhead cam, screw and locknut valve adjustment, a single internal counterbalancer, and vertically split crankcases; all of these changes making it different from the original Revolution design.

==== Düsseldorf-Test ====
An extreme endurance test of the Revolution engine was performed in a dynamometer installation at the Harley-Davidson factory in Milwaukee, simulating the German Autobahn (highways without general speed limit) between the Porsche research and development center in Weissach, near Stuttgart to Düsseldorf. An undisclosed number of samples of engines failed, until an engine successfully passed the 500-hour nonstop run. This was the benchmark for the engineers to approve the start of production for the Revolution engine, which was documented in the Discovery channel special Harley-Davidson: Birth of the V-Rod, October 14, 2001.

=== Single-cylinder engines ===
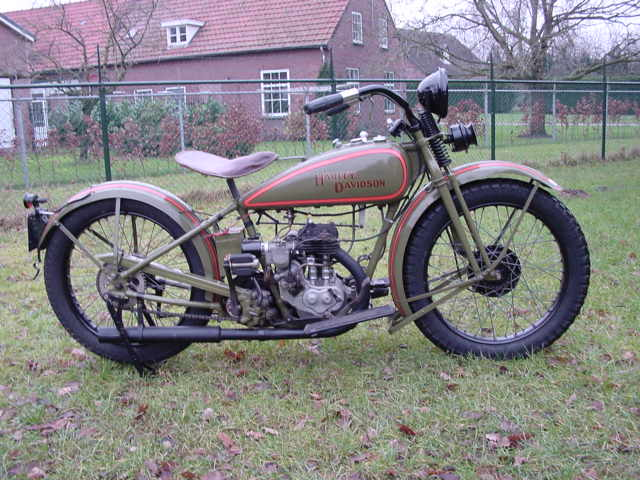
1928 Harley-Davidson single-cylinder motorcycle

IOE singles

The first Harley-Davidson motorcycles were powered by single-cylinder IOE engines with the inlet valve operated by engine vacuum, based on the DeDion-Bouton pattern. Singles of this type continued to be made until 1913, when a pushrod and rocker system was used to operate the overhead inlet valve on the single, a similar system having been used on their V-twins since 1911. Single-cylinder motorcycle engines were discontinued in 1918.

Flathead and OHV singles

Single-cylinder engines were reintroduced in 1925 as 1926 models. These singles were available either as flathead engines or as overhead valve engines until 1930, after which they were only available as flatheads. The flathead single-cylinder motorcycles were designated Model A for engines with magneto systems only and Model B for engines with battery and coil systems, while overhead valve versions were designated Model AA and Model BA respectively, and a magneto-only racing version was designated Model S. This line of single-cylinder motorcycles ended production in 1934.

Two-stroke singles

== Model families ==
Modern Harley-branded motorcycles fall into one of seven model families: Touring, Softail, Dyna, Sportster, Vrod, Street and LiveWire. These model families are distinguished by the frame, engine, suspension, and other characteristics.

=== Touring ===
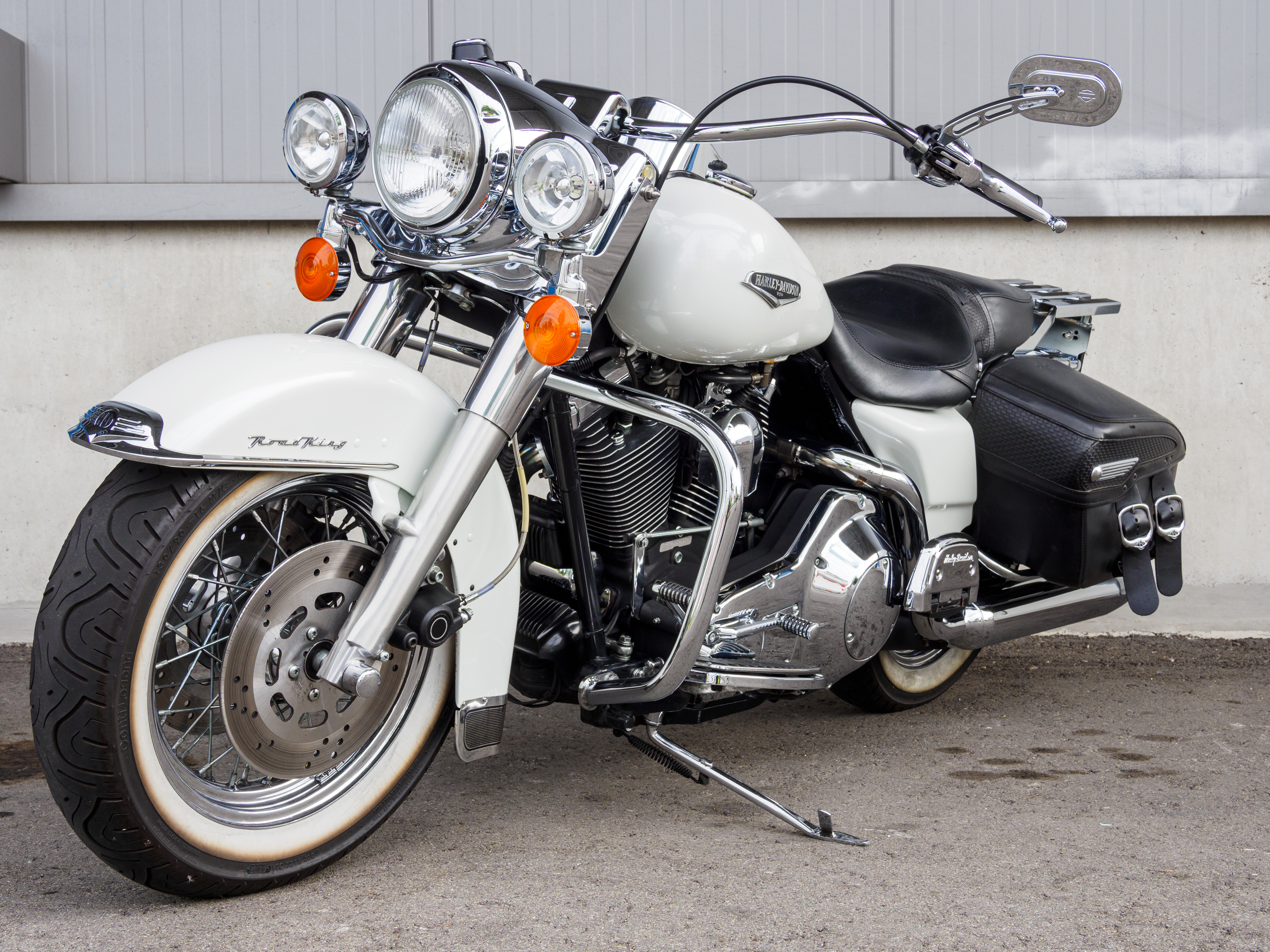
Harley-Davidson Road King

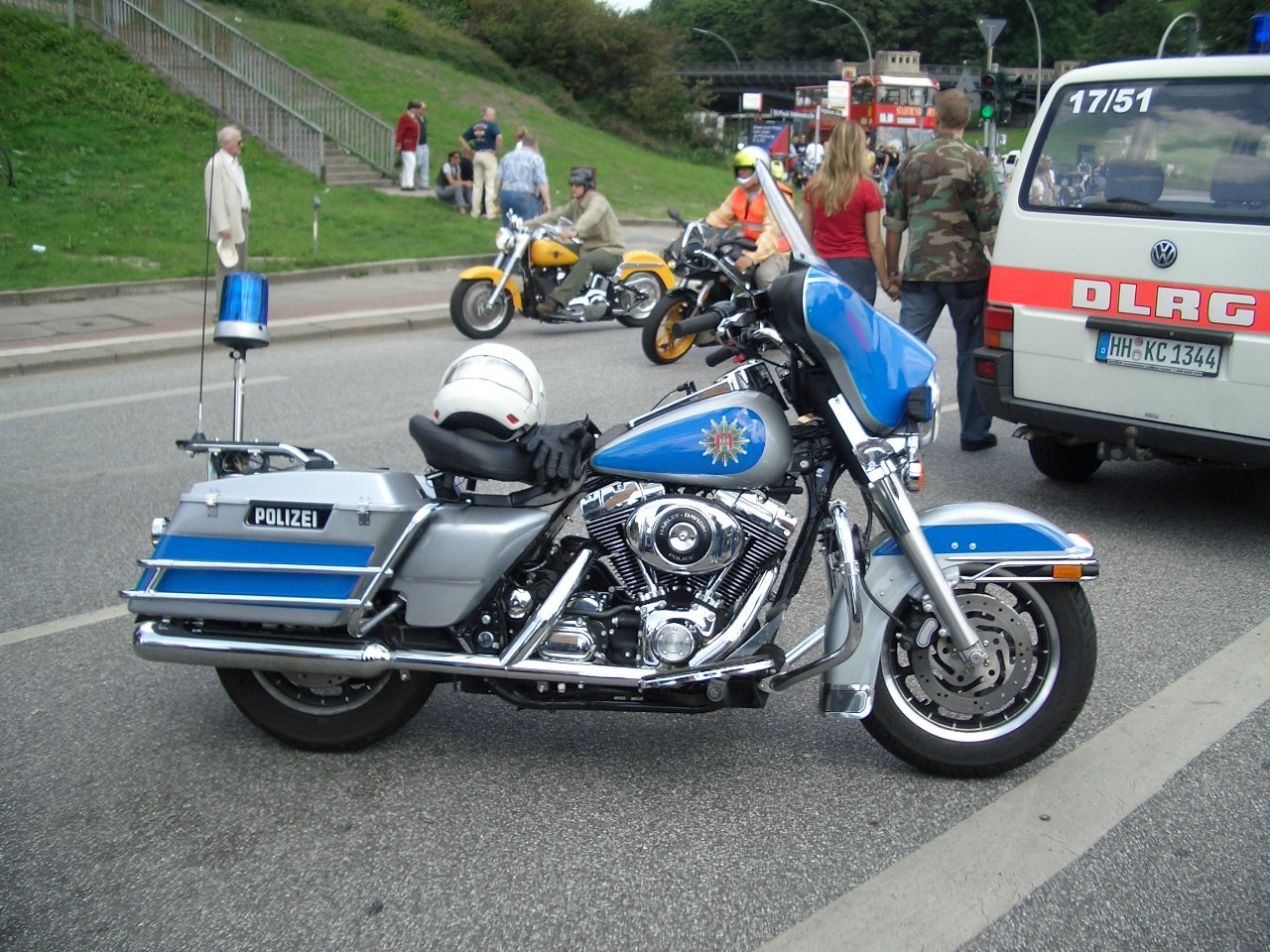
Hamburg Police Electra Glide

Touring models use Big-Twin engines and large-diameter telescopic forks. All Touring designations begin with the letters FL, e.g., FLHR (Road King) and FLTR (Road Glide).

The touring family, also known as "dressers" or "baggers", includes Road King, Road Glide, Electra Glide and Street Glide models offered in various trims. The Road Kings have a "retro cruiser" appearance and are equipped with a large clear windshield. Road Kings are reminiscent of big-twin models from the 1940s and 1950s. Electra Glides can be identified by their full front fairings. Most Electra Glides sport a fork-mounted fairing referred to as the "Batwing" due to its unmistakable shape. The Road Glide and Road Glide Ultra Classic have a frame-mounted fairing, referred to as the "Sharknose". The Sharknose includes a unique, dual front headlight.

Touring models are distinguishable by their large saddlebags, rear coil-over air suspension and are the only models to offer full fairings with radios and CBs. All touring models use the same frame, first introduced with a Shovelhead motor in 1980, and carried forward with only modest upgrades until 2009, when it was extensively redesigned. The frame is distinguished by the location of the steering head in front of the forks and was the first H-D frame to rubber mount the drivetrain to isolate the rider from the vibration of the big V-twin.

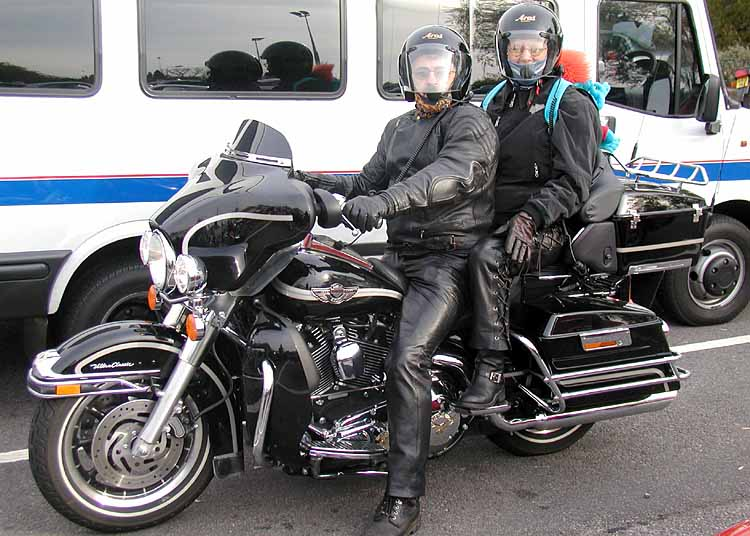
Electra Glide "Ultra Classic"

The frame was modified for the 1993 model year when the oil tank went under the transmission and the battery was moved inboard from under the right saddlebag to under the seat. In 1997, the frame was again modified to allow for a larger battery under the seat and to lower seat height. In 2007, Harley-Davidson introduced the 96-cubic-inch (1,570 cc) Twin Cam 96 engine, as well the six-speed transmission to give the rider better speeds on the highway.

In 2006, Harley introduced the FLHX Street Glide, a bike designed by Willie G. Davidson to be his personal ride, to its touring line.

In 2008, Harley added anti-lock braking systems and cruise control as a factory installed option on all touring models (standard on CVO and Anniversary models). Also new for 2008 is the 6-US-gallon (23 L; 5.0 imp gal) fuel tank for all touring models. 2008 also brought throttle-by-wire to all touring models.

For the 2009 model year, Harley-Davidson redesigned the entire touring range with several changes, including a new frame, new swingarm, a completely revised engine-mounting system, 17-inch (430 mm) front wheels for all but the FLHRC Road King Classic, and a 2–1–2 exhaust. The changes result in greater load carrying capacity, better handling, a smoother engine, longer range and less exhaust heat transmitted to the rider and passenger. Also released for the 2009 model year is the FLHTCUTG Tri-Glide Ultra Classic, the first three-wheeled Harley since the Servi-Car was discontinued in 1973. The model features a unique frame and a 103-cubic-inch (1,690 cc) engine exclusive to the trike.

In 2014, Harley-Davidson released a redesign for specific touring bikes and called it "Project Rushmore". Changes include a new 103CI High Output engine, one handed easy open saddlebags and compartments, a new Boom! Box Infotainment system with either 4.3-inch (10 cm) or 6.5-inch (16.5 cm) screens featuring touchscreen functionality [6.5-inch (16.5 cm) models only], Bluetooth (media and phone with approved compatible devices), available GPS and SiriusXM, Text-to-Speech functionality (with approved compatible devices) and USB connectivity with charging. Other features include ABS with Reflex linked brakes, improved styling, Halogen or LED lighting and upgraded passenger comfort.

=== Softail ===
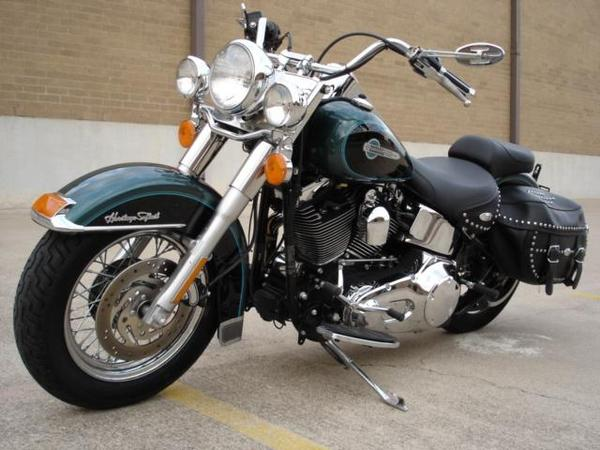
2002 Softail Heritage Classic

These big-twin motorcycles capitalize on Harley's strong value on tradition. With the rear-wheel suspension hidden under the transmission, they are visually similar to the "hardtail" choppers popular in the 1960s and 1970s, as well as from their own earlier history. In keeping with that tradition, Harley offers Softail models with "Heritage" styling that incorporate design cues from throughout their history and used to offer "Springer" front ends on these Softail models from the factory.

Designation

Softail models utilize the big-twin engine (F) and the Softail chassis (ST).

- Softail models that use 21-inch (530 mm) Front Wheels have designations that begin with FX, e.g., FXSTB (Night Train), FXSTD (Deuce), and FXSTS (Springer).
- Softail models that use 16-inch (410 mm) Front Wheels have designations beginning with FL, e.g., FLSTF (Fat Boy), FLSTC (Heritage Softail Classic), FLSTN (Softail Deluxe) and FLS (Softail Slim).
- Softail models that use Springer forks with a 21-inch (530 mm) wheel have designations that begin with FXSTS, e.g., FXSTS (Springer Softail) and FXSTSB (Bad Boy).
- Softail models that use Springer forks with a 16-inch (410 mm) wheel have designations that begin with FLSTS, e.g., FLSTSC (Springer Classic) and FLSTSB (Cross Bones).

=== Dyna ===
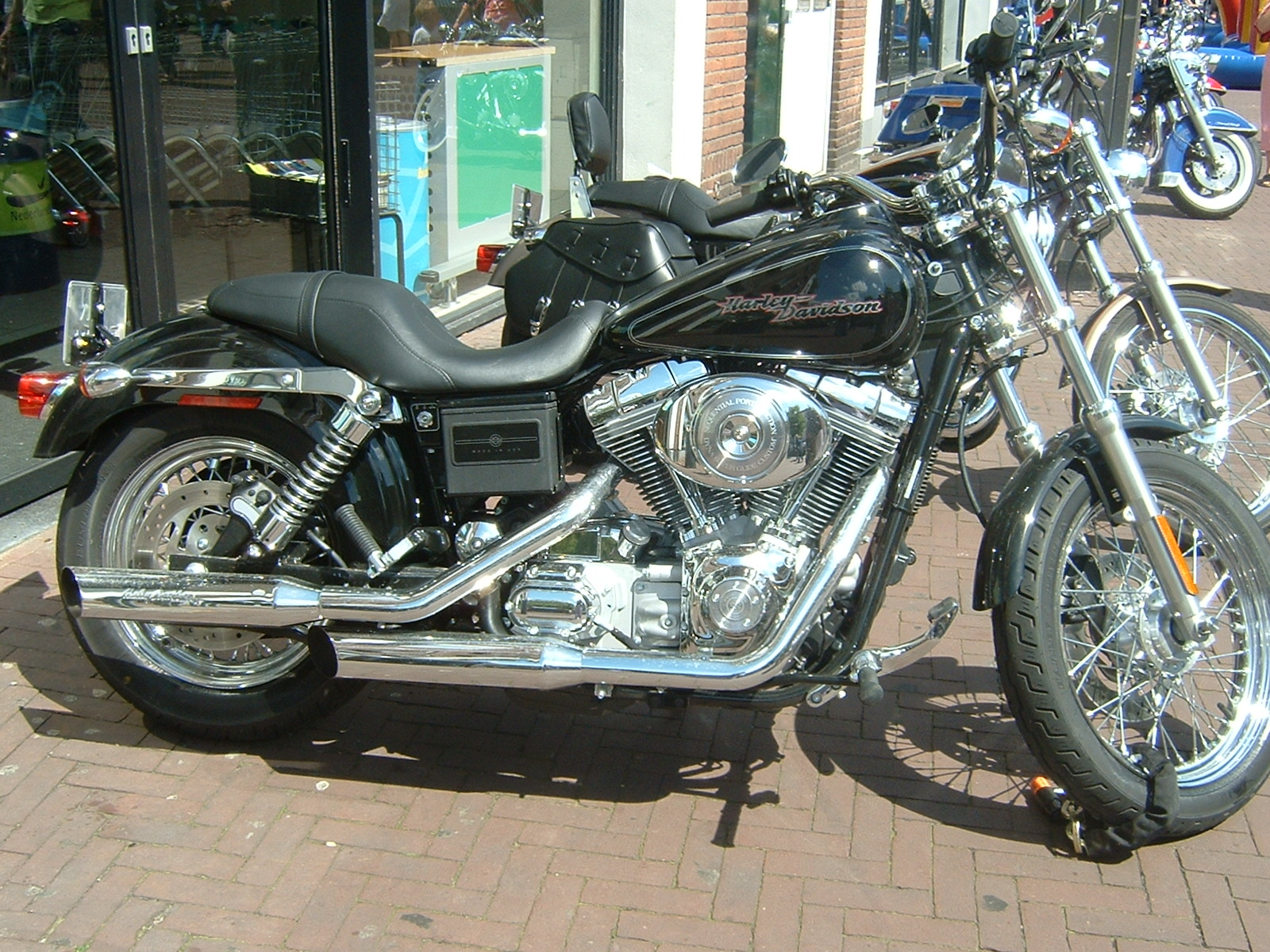
2005 Dyna Super Glide Custom

Dyna-frame motorcycles were developed in the 1980s and early 1990s and debuted in the 1991 model year with the FXDB Sturgis offered in limited edition quantities. In 1992 the line continued with the limited edition FXDB Daytona and a production model FXD Super Glide. The new DYNA frame featured big-twin engines and traditional styling. They can be distinguished from the Softail by the traditional coil-over suspension that connects the swingarm to the frame, and from the Sportster by their larger engines. On these models, the transmission also houses the engine's oil reservoir.

Prior to 2006, Dyna models typically featured a narrow, XL-style 39mm front fork and front wheel, as well as footpegs ] which the manufacturer indicated with the letter "X" in the model designation. This lineup traditionally included the Super Glide (FXD), Super Glide Custom (FXDC), Street Bob (FXDB), and Low Rider (FXDL). One exception was the Wide Glide (FXDWG), which featured thicker 41mm forks and a narrow front wheel, but positioned the forks on wider triple-trees that give a beefier appearance. In 2008, the Dyna Fat Bob (FXDF) was introduced to the Dyna lineup, featuring aggressive styling like a new 2–1–2 exhaust, twin headlamps, a 180 mm rear tire, and, for the first time in the Dyna lineup, a 130 mm front tire. For the 2012 model year, the Dyna Switchback (FLD) became the first Dyna to break the tradition of having an FX model designation with floorboards, detachable painted hard saddlebags, touring windshield, headlight nacelle and a wide front tire with full fender. The new front end resembled the big-twin FL models from 1968 to 1971.

The Dyna family used the 88-cubic-inch (1,440 cc) twin cam from 1999 to 2006. In 2007, the displacement was increased to 96 cubic inches (1,570 cc) as the factory increased the stroke to 4.375 inches (111.1 mm). For the 2012 model year, the manufacturer began to offer Dyna models with the 103-cubic-inch (1,690 cc) upgrade. All Dyna models use a rubber-mounted engine to isolate engine vibration. Harley discontinued the Dyna platform in 2017 for the 2018 model year, having been replaced by a completely redesigned Softail chassis; some of the existing models previously released by the company under the Dyna nameplate have since been carried over to the new Softail line.

Designation

Dyna models utilize the big-twin engine (F), footpegs noted as (X) with the exception of the 2012 FLD Switchback, a Dyna model which used floorboards as featured on the Touring (L) models, and the Dyna chassis (D). Therefore, except for the FLD from 2012 to 2016, all Dyna models have designations that begin with FXD, e.g., FXDWG (Dyna Wide Glide) and FXDL (Dyna Low Rider).

=== Sportster ===
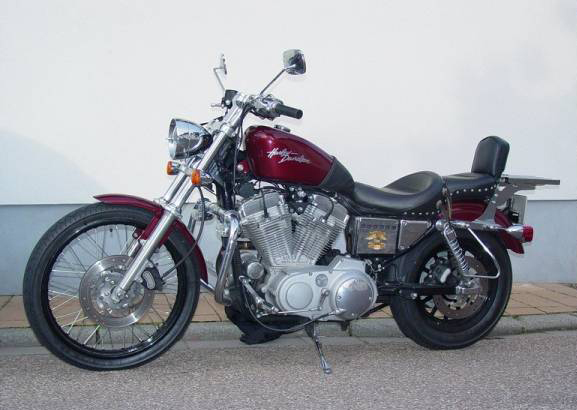
2002 Sportster 883 Custom

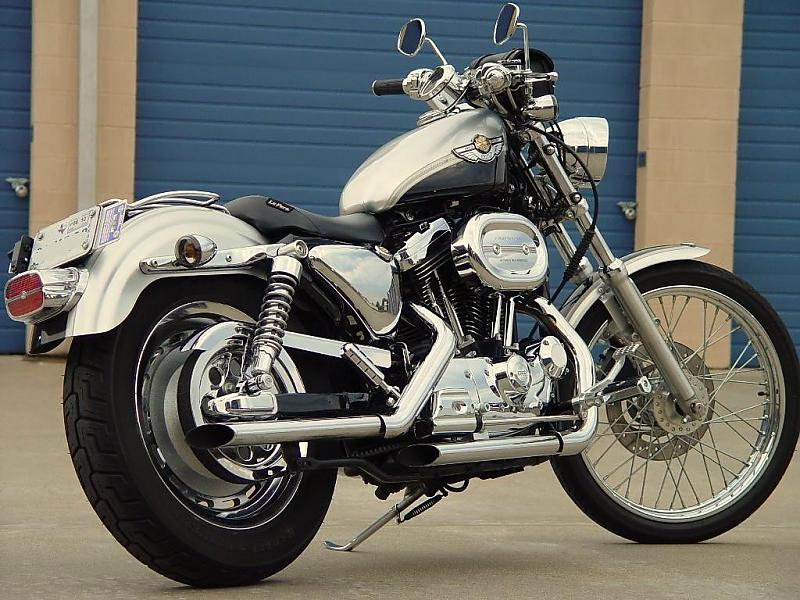
2003 Harley-Davidson XL1200 Custom Anniversary Edition

Introduced in 1957, the Sportster family was conceived as racing motorcycles, and were popular on dirt and flat-track race courses through the 1960s and 1970s. Smaller and lighter than the other Harley models, contemporary Sportsters make use of 883 cc or 1,200 cc Evolution engines and, though often modified, remain similar in appearance to their racing ancestors.

Up until the 2003 model year, the engine on the Sportster was rigidly mounted to the frame. The 2004 Sportster received a new frame accommodating a rubber-mounted engine. This made the bike heavier and reduced the available lean angle, while it reduced the amount of vibration transmitted to the frame and the rider, providing a smoother ride for rider and passenger.

In the 2007 model year, Harley-Davidson celebrated the 50th anniversary of the Sportster and produced a limited edition called the XL50, of which only 2000 were made for sale worldwide. Each motorcycle was individually numbered and came in one of two colors, Mirage Pearl Orange or Vivid Black. Also in 2007, electronic fuel injection was introduced to the Sportster family, and the Nightster model was introduced in mid-year. In 2009, Harley-Davidson added the Iron 883 to the Sportster line, as part of the Dark Custom series. In the 2008 model year, Harley-Davidson released the XR1200 Sportster in Europe, Africa, and the Middle East. The XR1200 had an Evolution engine tuned to produce 91 bhp (68 kW), four-piston dual front disc brakes, and an aluminum swing arm. Motorcyclist featured the XR1200 on the cover of its July 2008 issue and was generally positive about it in their "First Ride" story, in which Harley-Davidson was repeatedly asked to sell it in the United States. One possible reason for the delayed availability in the United States was that Harley-Davidson had to obtain the "XR1200" naming rights from Storz Performance, a Harley customizing shop in Ventura, Calif. The XR1200 was released in the United States in 2009 in a special color scheme including Mirage Orange highlighting its dirt-tracker heritage. The first 750 XR1200 models in 2009 were pre-ordered and came with a number 1 tag for the front of the bike, autographed by Kenny Coolbeth and Scott Parker and a thank you/welcome letter from the company, signed by Bill Davidson. The XR1200 was discontinued in model year 2013.

In 2021, Harley-Davidson launched the Sportster S model, with a 121 hp engine and 228 kg ready-to-ride weight. The Sportster S was one of the first Harleys to come with cornering-ABS and lean-sensitive traction control. The Sportster S is also the first model under the Sportster nameplate since 1957 to receive a completely new engine.

Designation

Except for the street-going XR1000 of the 1980s and the XR1200, most Sportsters made for street use have the prefix XL in their model designation. For the Sportster Evolution engines used since the mid-1980s, there have been two engine sizes. Motorcycles with the smaller engine are designated XL883, while those with the larger engine were initially designated XL1100. When the size of the larger engine was increased from 1,100 cc to 1,200 cc, the designation was changed accordingly from XL1100 to XL1200. Subsequent letters in the designation refer to model variations within the Sportster range, e.g. the XL883C refers to an 883 cc Sportster Custom, while the XL1200S designates the now-discontinued 1200 Sportster Sport.

=== VRSC ===
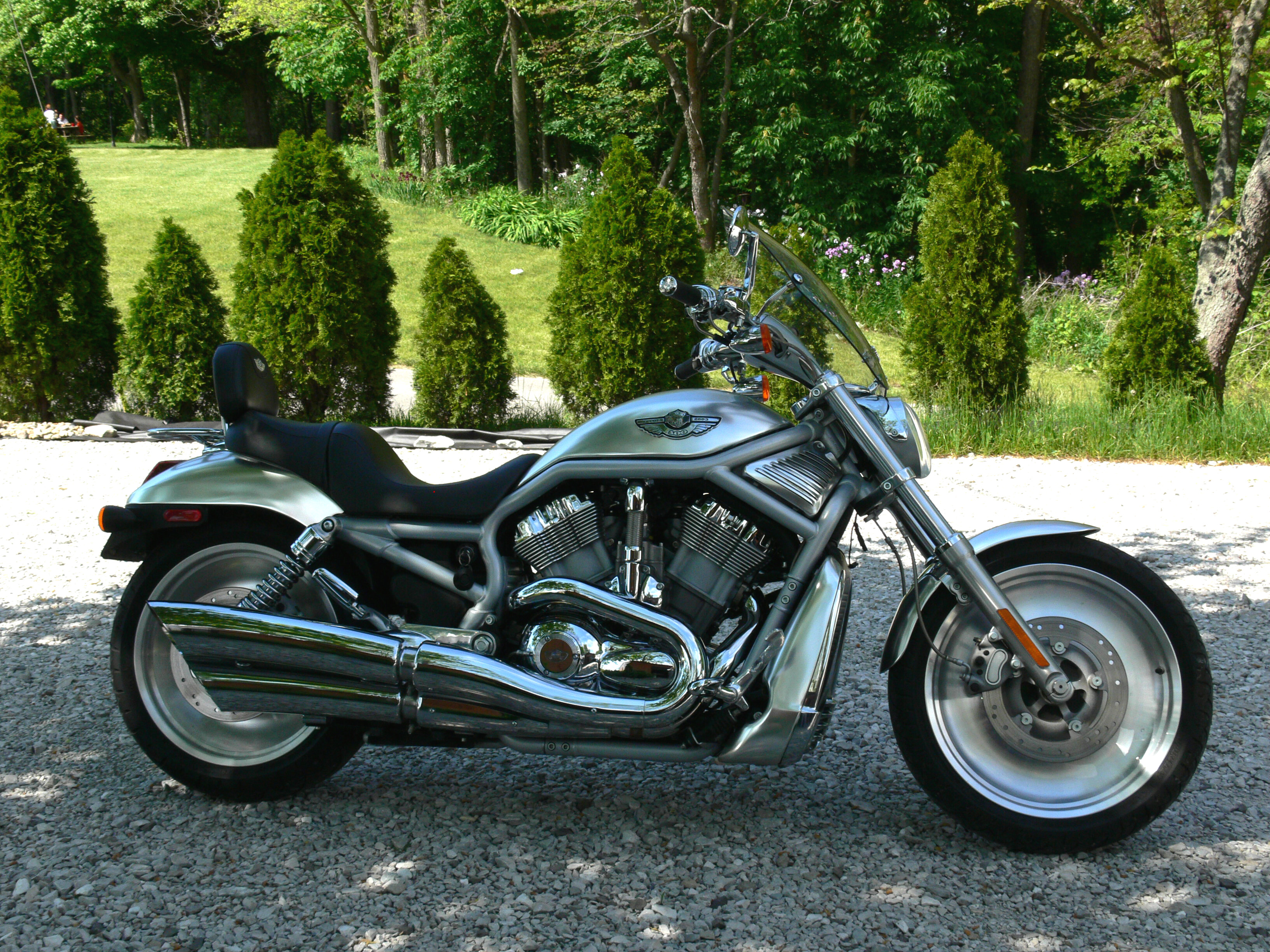
2003 VRSCA V-Rod

Introduced in 2001 and produced until 2017, the VRSC muscle bike family bears little resemblance to Harley's more traditional lineup. Competing against Japanese and American muscle bikes in the upcoming muscle bike/power cruiser segment, the "V-Rod" makes use of the revolution engine that, for the first time in Harley history, incorporates overhead cams and liquid cooling. The V-Rod is visually distinctive, easily identified by the 60-degree V-Twin engine, the radiator and the hydroformed frame members that support the round-topped air cleaner cover. The VRSC platform was also used for factory drag-racing motorcycles.

In 2008, Harley added the anti-lock braking system as a factory-installed option on all VRSC models. Harley also increased the displacement of the stock engine from 1,130 to 1,250 cc (69 to 76 cu in), which had only previously been available from Screamin' Eagle, and added a slipper clutch as standard equipment.

VRSC models include:

- VRSCA: V-Rod (2002–2006), VRSCAW: V-Rod (2007–2010), VRSCB: V-Rod (2004–2005), VRSCD: Night Rod (2006–2008), VRSCDX: Night Rod Special (2007–2014), VRSCSE: Screamin' Eagle CVO V-Rod (2005), VRSCSE2: Screamin' Eagle CVO V-Rod (2006), VRSCR: Street Rod (2006–2007), VRSCX: Screamin' Eagle Tribute V-Rod (2007), VRSCF: V-Rod Muscle (2009–2014).

VRSC models utilize the Revolution engine (VR), and the street versions are designated Street Custom (SC). After the VRSC prefix common to all street Revolution bikes, the next letter denotes the model, either A (base V-Rod: discontinued), AW (base V-Rod + W for Wide with a 240 mm rear tire), B (discontinued), D (Night Rod: discontinued), R (Street Rod: discontinued), SE and SEII (CVO Special Edition), or X (Special edition). Further differentiation within models are made with an additional letter, e.g., VRSCDX denotes the Night Rod Special.

==== VRXSE ====
The VRXSE V-Rod Destroyer is Harley-Davidson's production drag racing motorcycle, constructed to run the quarter mile in less than ten seconds. It is based on the same revolution engine that powers the VRSC line, but the VRXSE uses the Screamin' Eagle 1,300 cc "stroked" incarnation, featuring a 75 mm crankshaft, 105 mm Pistons, and 58 mm throttle bodies.

The V-Rod Destroyer is not a street-legal motorcycle. As such, it uses "X" instead of "SC" to denote a non-street bike. "SE" denotes a CVO Special Edition.

=== Street ===
The Street, Harley-Davidson's newest platform and their first all new platform in thirteen years, was designed to appeal to younger riders looking for a lighter bike at a cheaper price. The Street 750 model was launched in India at the 2014 Indian Auto Expo, Delhi-NCR on February 5, 2014. The Street 750 weighs 218 kg and has a ground clearance of 144 mm giving it the lowest weight and the highest ground clearance of Harley-Davidson motorcycles currently available.

The Street 750 uses an all-new, liquid-cooled, 60° V-twin engine called the Revolution X. In the Street 750, the engine displaces 749 cc (45.7 cu in) and produces 65 Nm at 4,000 rpm. A six speed transmission is used.

The Street 750 and the smaller-displacement Street 500 have been available since late 2014. Street series motorcycles for the North American market will be built in Harley-Davidson's Kansas City, Missouri plant, while those for other markets around the world will be built completely in their plant in Bawal, India.

=== LiveWire ===
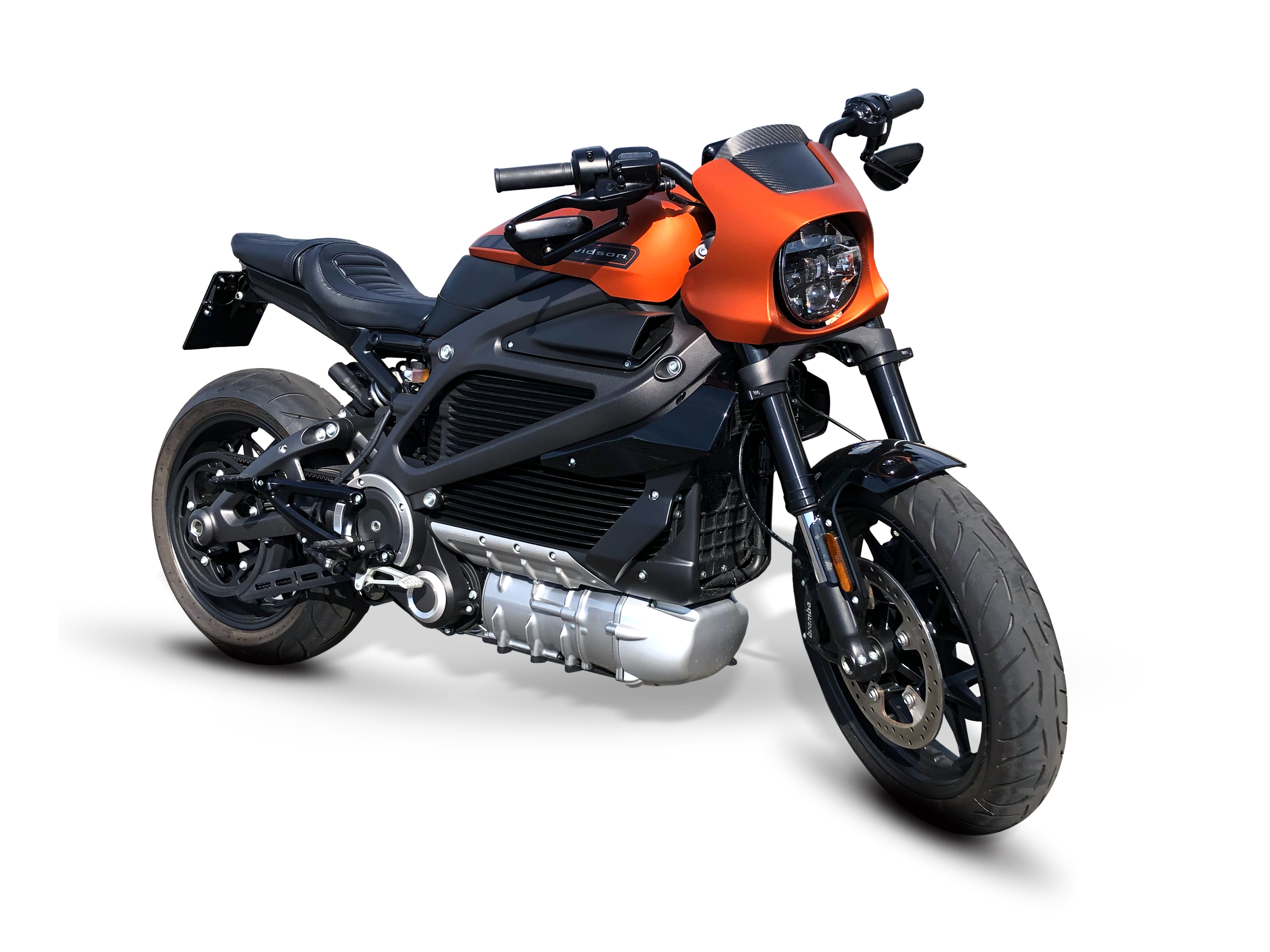
The electric LiveWire motorcycle

Harley-Davidson's LiveWire, released in 2019, is their first electric vehicle. The high-voltage battery provides a minimum city range of 98 miles (158 km). The LiveWire targets a different type of customer than their classic V-twin powered motorcycles.

In March 2020, a Harley-Davidson LiveWire was used to break the 24-hour distance record for an electric motorcycle. The bike traveled a reported 1,723 km (1,079 miles) in 23 hours and 48 minutes. The LiveWire offers a Level 1 slow recharge, which uses a regular wall outlet to refill an empty battery overnight, or a quick Level 3 DC Fast Charge. The Fast Charge fills the battery most of the way in about 40 minutes. Swiss rider Michel von Tell used the Level 3 charging to make the 24-hour ride.

In December 2021, the company announced that LiveWire was to be spun-off from parent Harley Davidson, set to go public in the first half of 2022 as a special-purpose acquisition company (SPAC) with the value estimated to be $1.77 billion.

== Custom Vehicle Operations ==
Custom Vehicle Operations (CVO) is a team within Harley-Davidson that produces limited-edition customizations of Harley's stock models. Every year since 1999, the team has selected two to five of the company's base models and added higher-displacement engines, performance upgrades, special-edition paint jobs, more chromed or accented components, audio system upgrades, and electronic accessories to create high-dollar, premium-quality customizations for the factory custom market. The models most commonly upgraded in such a fashion are the Ultra Classic Electra Glide, which has been selected for CVO treatment every year from 2006 to the present, and the Road King, which was selected in 2002, 2003, 2007, and 2008. The Dyna, Softail, and VRSC families have also been selected for CVO customization.

== Environmental record ==
The Environmental Protection Agency conducted emissions-certification and representative emissions test in Ann Arbor, Michigan, in 2005. Subsequently, Harley-Davidson produced an "environmental warranty". The warranty ensures each owner that the vehicle is designed and built free of any defects in materials and workmanship that would cause the vehicle to not meet EPA standards. In 2005, the EPA and the Pennsylvania Department of Environmental Protection (PADEP) confirmed Harley-Davidson to be the first corporation to voluntarily enroll in the One Clean-Up Program. This program is designed for the clean-up of the affected soil and groundwater at the former York Naval Ordnance Plant. The program is backed by the state and local government along with participating organizations and corporations.

Paul Gotthold, Director of Operations for the EPA, congratulated the motor company:

Harley-Davidson has taken their environmental responsibilities very seriously and has already made substantial progress in the investigation and cleanup of past contamination. Proof of Harley's efforts can be found in the recent EPA determination that designates the Harley property as 'under control' for cleanup purposes. This determination means that there are no serious contamination problems at the facility. Under the new One Cleanup Program, Harley, EPA, and PADEP will expedite the completion of the property investigation and reach a final solution that will permanently protect human health and the environment.

Harley-Davidson also purchased most of Castalloy, a South Australian producer of cast motorcycle wheels and hubs. The South Australian government has set forth "protection to the purchaser (Harley-Davidson) against environmental risks".

In August 2016, Harley-Davidson settled with the EPA for $12 million, without admitting wrongdoing, over the sale of after-market "super tuners". Super tuners were devices, marketed for competition, which enabled increased performance of Harley-Davidson products. However, the devices also modified the emission control systems, producing increased hydrocarbon and nitrogen oxide. Harley-Davidson is required to buy back and destroy any super tuners which do not meet Clean Air Act requirements and spend $3 million on air pollution mitigation.

== Brand culture ==
Harley-Davidson Cafe theme restaurant located on the Las Vegas Strip

According to a recent Harley-Davidson study, in 1987 half of all Harley riders were under age 35. However, by 2006, only 15 percent of Harley buyers were under 35, and as of 2005, the median age had risen to 46.7. In 2008, Harley-Davidson stopped disclosing the average age of riders; at this point it was 48 years old.

In 1987, the median household income of a Harley-Davidson rider was $38,000. By 1997, the median household income for those riders had more than doubled, to $83,000.

Many Harley-Davidson Clubs exist nowadays around the world; the oldest one, founded in 1928, is in Prague.

Harley-Davidson attracts a large brand community, with licensing of the Harley-Davidson logo accounting for almost 5 percent of the company's net revenue ($41 million in 2004). Harley-Davidson supplies many American police forces with their motorcycle fleets.

From its founding, Harley-Davidson had worked to brand its motorcycles as respectable and refined products, with ads that showed what motorcycling writer Fred Rau called "refined-looking ladies with parasols, and men in conservative suits as the target market". The 1906 Harley-Davidson's effective, and polite, muffler was emphasized in advertisements with the nickname "The Silent Gray Fellow". That began to shift in the 1960s, partially in response to the clean-cut motorcyclist portrayed in Honda's "You meet the nicest people on a Honda" campaign, when Harley-Davidson sought to draw a contrast with Honda by underscoring the more working-class, macho, and even a little anti-social attitude associated with motorcycling's dark side. With the 1971 FX Super Glide, the company embraced, rather than distanced itself from, chopper style and the counterculture custom Harley scene. Their marketing cultivated the "bad boy" image of biker and motorcycle clubs, and to a point, even outlaw or one-percenter motorcycle clubs. In 2013, Harley-Davidson dealership in Quebec published a controversial advertisement featuring a woman wearing a hijab instead of the brand's traditional leather-clad imagery, drawing media attention during debates over secularism in Quebec.

=== Origin of "Hog" nickname ===
Beginning in 1920, a team of farm boys, including Ray Weishaar, who became known as the "hog boys", consistently won races. The group had a live hog as their mascot. Following a win, they would put the hog on their Harley and take a victory lap. In 1983, the Motor Company formed a club for owners of its product, taking advantage of the long-standing nickname by turning "hog" into the acronym HOG, for Harley Owners Group. Harley-Davidson attempted to trademark "hog", but lost a case against an independent Harley-Davidson specialist, The Hog Farm of West Seneca, New York, in 1999, when the appellate panel ruled that "hog" had become a generic term for large motorcycles and was therefore unprotectable as a trademark.

On August 15, 2006, Harley-Davidson Inc. had its NYSE ticker symbol changed from HDI to HOG.

=== Bobbers ===
Harley-Davidson FL "big twins" normally had heavy steel fenders, chrome trim, and other ornate and heavy accessories. After World War II, riders wanting more speed would often shorten the fenders or take them off completely to reduce the weight of the motorcycle. These bikes were called "bobbers" or sometimes "choppers", because parts considered unnecessary were chopped off. Those who made or rode choppers and bobbers, especially members of motorcycle clubs like the Hells Angels, referred to stock FLs as "garbage wagons".

=== Harley Owners Group ===
Harley-Davidson established the Harley Owners Group (HOG) in 1983 to build on the loyalty of Harley-Davidson enthusiasts as a means to promote a lifestyle alongside its products. The HOG also opened new revenue streams for the company, with the production of tie-in merchandise offered to club members, numbering more than one million. Other motorcycle brands, and other and consumer brands outside motorcycling, have also tried to create factory-sponsored community marketing clubs of their own. HOG members typically spend 30 percent more than other Harley owners on such items as clothing and Harley-Davidson-sponsored events.

In 1991, HOG went international, with the first official European HOG Rally in Cheltenham, England. Today, more than one million members and more than 1400 chapters worldwide make HOG the largest factory-sponsored motorcycle organization in the world.

HOG benefits include organized group rides, exclusive products and product discounts, insurance discounts, and the Hog Tales newsletter. A one-year full membership is included with the purchase of a new, unregistered Harley-Davidson.

In 2008, HOG celebrated its 25th anniversary in conjunction with the Harley 105th in Milwaukee, Wisconsin.

3rd Southern HOG Rally set to bring together largest gathering of Harley-Davidson owners in South India. More than 600 Harley-Davidson Owners expected to ride to Hyderabad from across 13 HOG Chapters.

=== Factory tours and museum ===
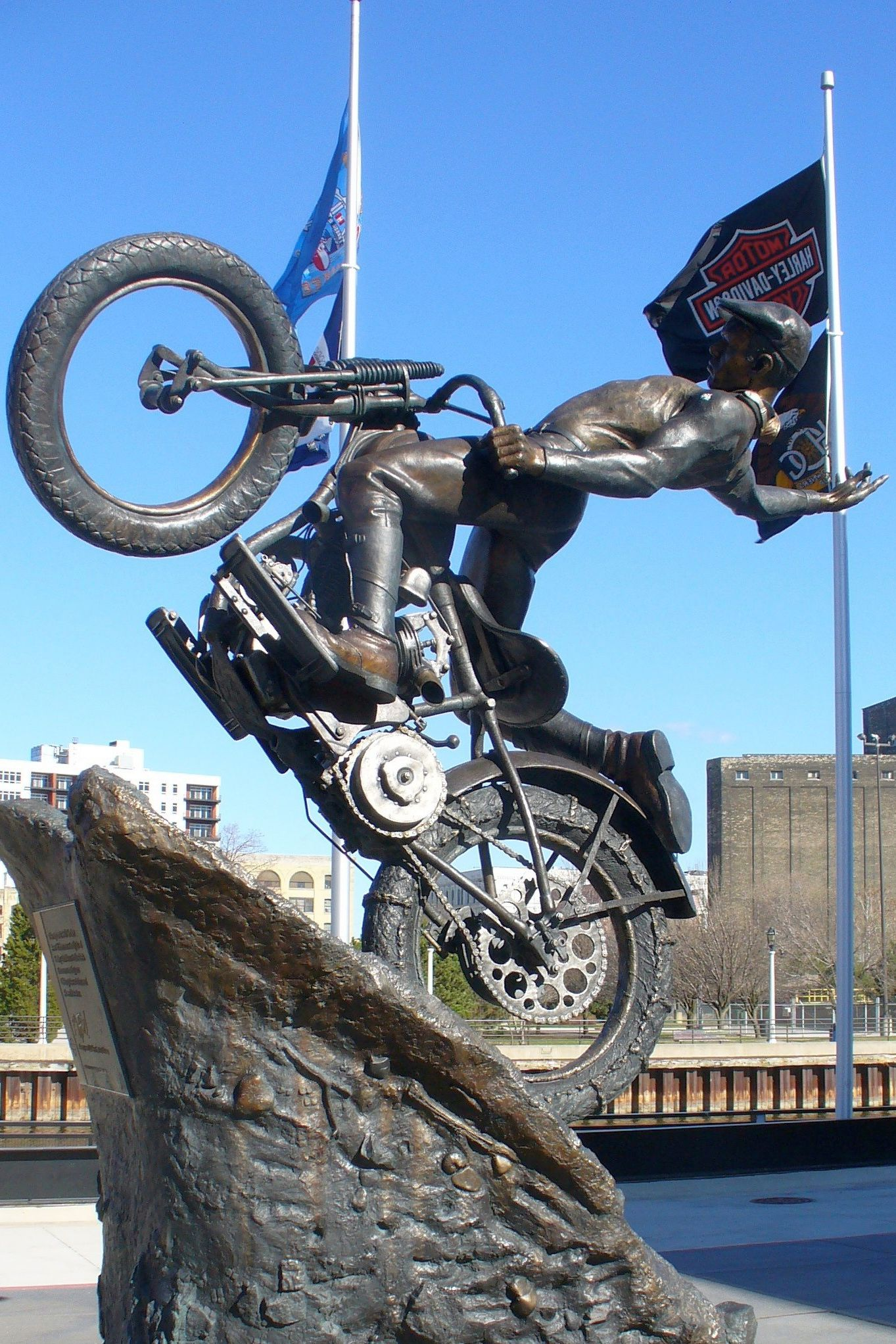
The Harley-Davidson Museum in Milwaukee

Harley-Davidson offers factory tours at four of its manufacturing sites, and the Harley-Davidson Museum, which opened in 2008, exhibits Harley-Davidson's history, culture, and vehicles, including the motor company's corporate archives.

- York, Pennsylvania – Vehicle Operations: Manufacturing site for Touring class, Softail, and custom vehicles.
- Tomahawk, Wisconsin – Tomahawk Operations: Facility that makes sidecars, saddlebags, windshields, and more.
- Kansas City, Missouri – Vehicle and Powertrain Operations: Manufacturing site of Sportster, VRSC, and other vehicles.
- Menomonee Falls, Wisconsin – Pilgrim Road Powertrain Operations plant, two types of tours.
- Milwaukee, Wisconsin – Harley-Davidson Museum: Archive; exhibits of people, products, culture and history; restaurant & café; and museum store.

Due to the consolidation of operations, the Capitol Drive Tour Center in Wauwatosa, Wisconsin, was closed in 2009.

=== Historic register designations ===
Some of the company's buildings have been listed on state and national historic registers, including:

- Harley-Davidson Motorcycle Factory Building – added to National Register of Historic Places on November 9, 1994.
- Factory No. 7 – added to Wisconsin State Register of Historic Places on August 14, 2020.

=== Anniversary celebrations ===
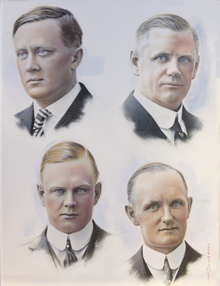
Clockwise from top left: William S. Harley, William A. Davidson, Walter Davidson Sr., Arthur Davidson

Beginning with Harley-Davidson's 90th anniversary in 1993, Harley-Davidson has had celebratory rides to Milwaukee called the "Ride Home". This new tradition has continued every five years, and is referred to unofficially as "Harleyfest", in line with Milwaukee's other festivals (Summerfest, German fest, Festa Italiana, etc.). This event brings Harley riders from all around the world. The 105th anniversary celebration was held on August 28–31, 2008, and included events in Milwaukee, Waukesha, Racine, and Kenosha counties, in Southeast Wisconsin. The 110th-anniversary celebration was held on August 29–31, 2013. The 115th anniversary was held in Prague, Czech Republic, the home country of the oldest existing Harley Davidson Club, on July 5–8, 2018 and attracted more than 100,000 visitors and 60,000 bikes. The 120th anniversary was held in Budapest, Hungary, with the parade on June 24.

=== Labor Hall of Fame ===
William S. Harley, Arthur Davidson, William A. Davidson and Walter Davidson Sr were, in 2004, inducted into the Labor Hall of Fame for their accomplishments for the H-D company and its workforce.

=== Television drama ===
The company's origins were dramatized in a 2016 miniseries entitled Harley and the Davidsons, starring Robert Aramayo as William Harley, Bug Hall as Arthur Davidson and Michiel Huisman as Walter Davidson, and premiered on the Discovery Channel as a "three-night event series" on September 5, 2016.

== See also ==
- List of Harley-Davidson motorcycles
- Harley-Davidson engine timeline
- Harley-Davidson (Bally pinball)
- Harley-Davidson (Sega/Stern pinball)
- Harley-Davidson & L.A. Riders
- Harley-Davidson: Race Across America
- List of motor scooter manufacturers and brands
- Bagger World Cup
