= Harley-Davidson FL =

HD FL 1200 Lowrider

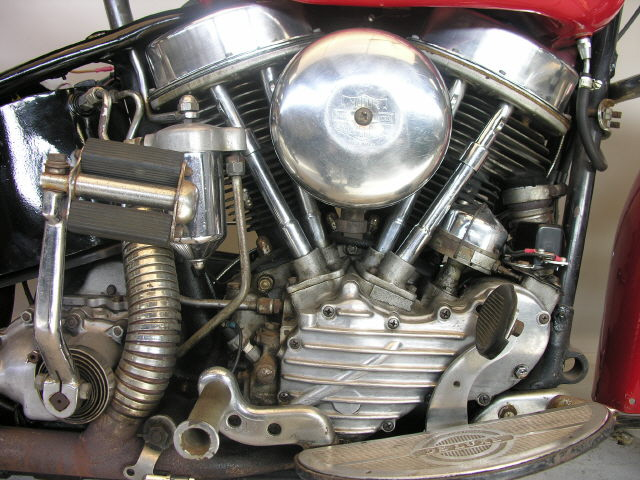
The V2 engine introduced in 1948, colloquially called Panhead, was available as E, EL, F, FL depending on size and compression

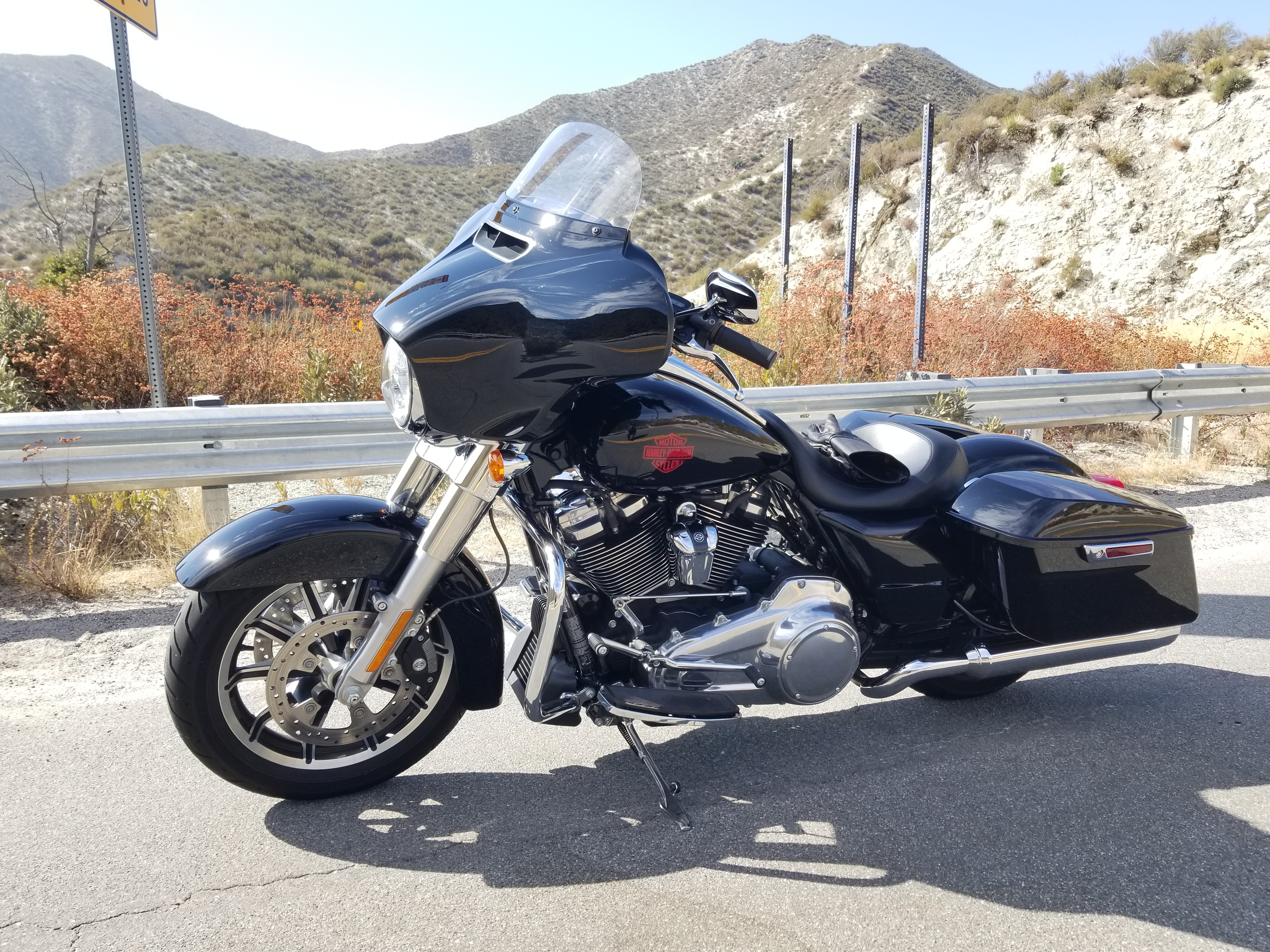
2019 Harley Davidson FLHT

Harley-Davidson FL is a model designation used for Harley-Davidson motorcycles since 1941, when F referred to the new large capacity 74 cui (1200cc) variant of the V-2 Overhead valve engine (″Knucklehead″) that was introduced in 1936 as Model E with 61 cui (1000cc). The presence of an additional letter L indicated higher compression, offering more power but requiring higher octane leaded gasoline. In the early 1950s, the low compression version was discontinued, and in 1952 also the low capacity EL, making FL the basic model designation of Big Twin engines for decades to come.

Additional letters marked options, like FLS for sidecar use, with adjustable fork and reverse gear. As police departments were major customers of HD, FLE for escort and law enforcement was tuned down for better idling and low speeds in cities. FLF marked the traditional foot clutch and hand shift after the move to the safer hand operated clutch and foot shifting. With a higher powered FLH option since the late 1950s, many FL were FLH.

Until the 1970s, all Harley-Davidson bigtwin FL models came with a front wheel that had the same size as the rear wheel, 5.00-16, and with large fender and wide fork to match, often combined with fairing, bags and additional chrome accessories as ″full dresser″. Customers often slimmed down the factory FL to create a ″bobber″ or even ″chopper″, removing the fender, the sheet metal and big head light, even adding slim 3.00-21 front wheels from other makes, or the whole fork of the smaller Harley-Davidson Sportster XL models that were introduced in 1957.

In 1971, the Harley-Davidson FX ″Super Glide″ was introduced as a ″factory chopper″, combining the FL frame and drive train with the smaller XL front end, basically creating the third, intermediate model range FX that sold and sells well. Since then, the FL prefix indicates that the traditional 16-inch front wheel and big fenders are used on ″Dresser″ Touring series or the traditional styling ″Heritage″ variants of the Softail series, while FX is used on sportier models or the chopper-like Softails with rather thin front wheels.

== Early FL models ==
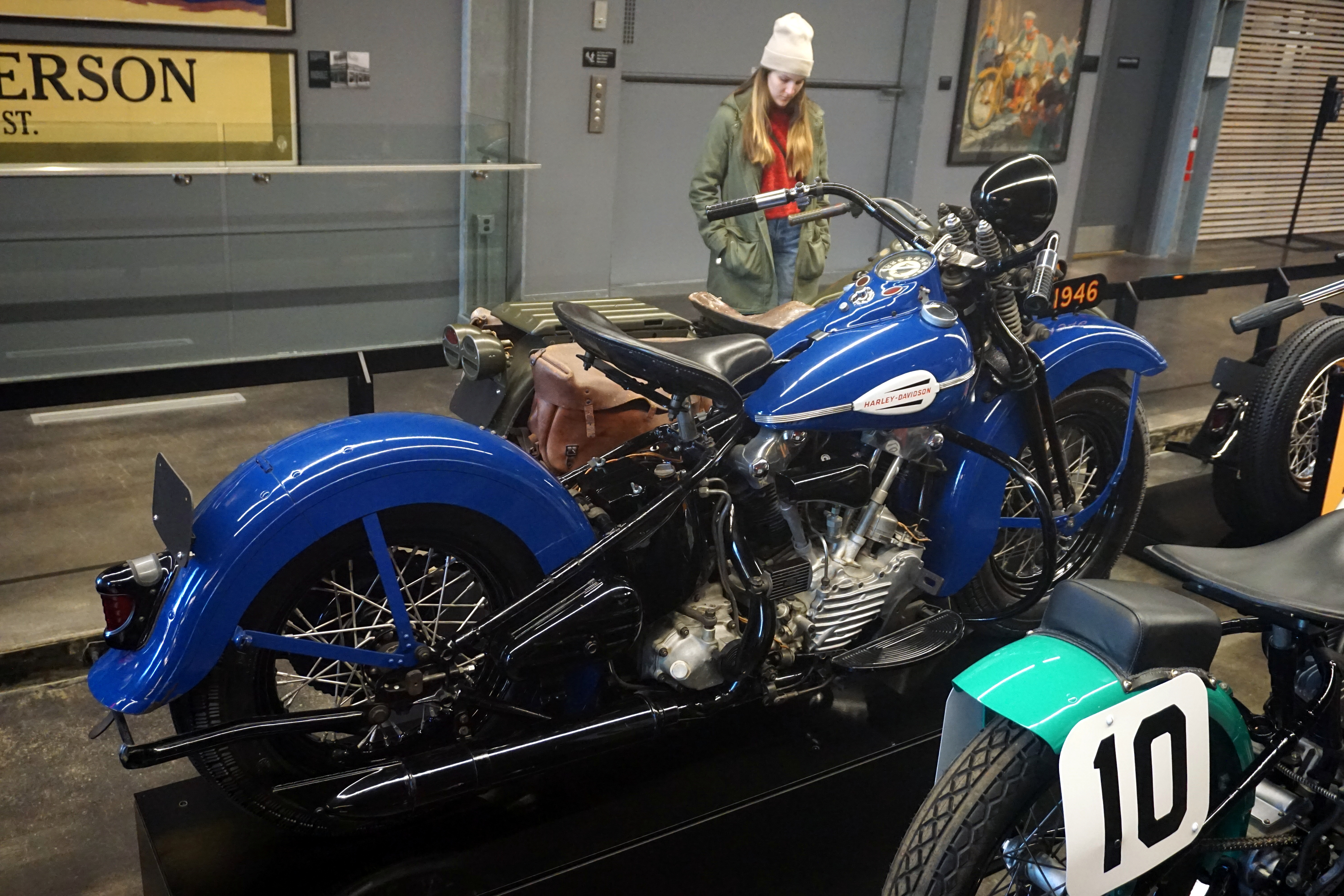
1946 Harley-Davidson FL at the Harley-Davidson Museum in Milwaukee

The F and FL were introduced to the Harley-Davidson model line in 1941, as large capacity versions of the Model E/EL introduced in 1936. It used a 74 cu in (1,210 cc) version of the "Knucklehead" OHV engine that powered the EL in 61 cu in (1,000 cc) form. The FL shared its frame with the EL and with the U and UL, which used a 74 cubic inch flathead engine. The FL replaced the UH and ULH, which used the same frame with 80 cu in (1,300 cc) flathead engines.

Only few Knucklehead FLs were built, as due to the war, Harley had to focus on military versions, mainly the WLA based on the simple WL flathead. HD even had to develop a BMW-like boxer model, the XA. After the war, Harley was challenged by imports of British motorcycles brands. The FL continued relatively unchanged until 1948, when it and the EL were given redesigned "Panhead" engines of the same capacities as before. These engines had several improvements over the earlier "Knuckleheads", including self-adjusting hydraulic lifters and aluminum cylinder heads to reduce weight and improve cooling. The U and UL flathead twins were discontinued in 1948, leaving the OHV EL and FL models as Harley-Davidson's large-frame motorcycles.

== Hydra-Glide ==
In 1949, a year after receiving the "Panhead" engine, the FL was given a new front suspension featuring hydraulically damped telescopic forks, replacing the leading link spring suspension of the time. These forks were standard on all big twin models for 1949, including the E, EL, F, and FL. Harley-Davidson offered the spring suspension units on these models and recommended their use on sidecar combinations, because the standard hydraulic forks do not have suitable trail.

During these front suspensions' debut model year of 1949, Harley-Davidson referred to them as "hydraulic front ends". Harley-Davidson's marketing department promoted the new suspension systems by renaming the big twin models "Hydra Glide" for the 1950 model year. This was Harley-Davidson's first departure from its policy of using simple letters to identify its models. This name was changed twice in the history of the basic large-framed E and F series models, each time signaling an improvement in the bike's technology. In addition, the Glide ending was added to the names of other models based on the FL and FX formats.

In 1952, the Hydra-Glide's transmission's standard hand-shift/foot-clutch arrangement was supplemented by an optional foot-shift/hand-clutch setup. The original layout remained an option until 1978. 1952 was also the last year of the 61 cu in (1,000 cc) EL, making the FL the last remaining large-frame model. Although the 1903 founding is now the basis for "Anniversary Models", Harley-Davidson's 50th Golden Anniversary was celebrated in 1954 with special paints and badges on the front fender. The first year of production was 1904. A more highly tuned engine with high-compression heads, higher-lift cams, and polished ports, was offered with the FLH version of 1955. The FLH designation has continued up to the present.

== Duo-Glide ==
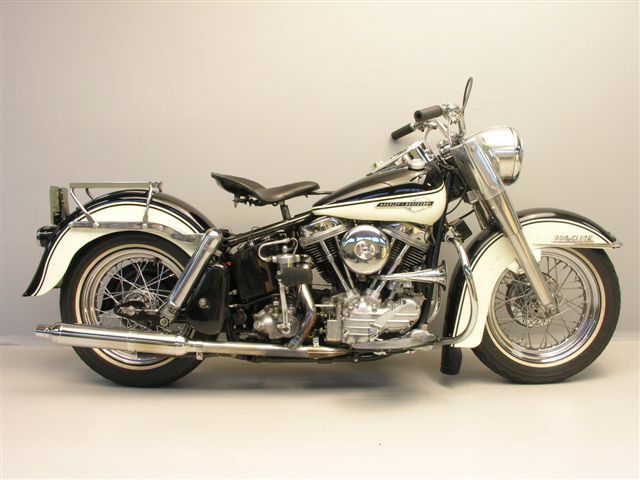
1961 FLH Duo-Glide

The FL model was given a new frame in 1958. This frame included a rear swingarm suspended by a pair of coil-over-shock suspension units. In honor of this fully suspended chassis, the FL's model name was changed from Hydra-Glide to Duo-Glide.

Unlike advancements such as the overhead valve engine, aluminum heads, and telescopic-fork front suspension, this improvement in technology was applied to the small-frame bikes first; the K-series having received rear suspension in 1952.

== Electra-Glide ==
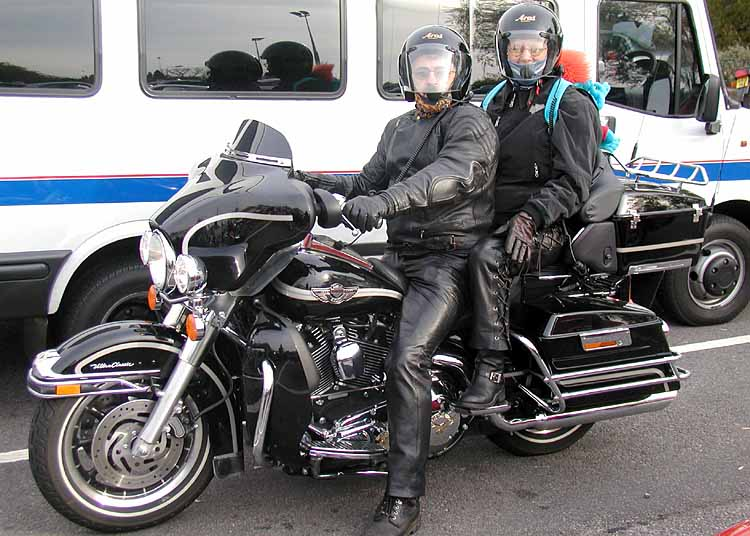
Electra Glide Ultra Classic. This is based on the Tour Glide frame, but uses the Electra Glide fork-mounted "batwing" fairing

The third and final change given to the name of the basic FL model would occur in 1965, the final year of the "Panhead" engines. These last Panheads were the first "Big Twin" Harley-Davidson engines to be equipped with electric starters; the Servi-Car having received electric start the year before. This innovation for Harley-Davidson was greeted with the new model name of Electra Glide. In 1966, the "Panhead" gave way to the "Shovelhead," gaining a ten percent increase in power in the process. A fork-mounted fairing became available on Electra Glides in 1969. This became unofficially known as the "batwing" fairing. Although the batwing fairing was an easily removable option on early Electra Glides, it was not removable on later machines, as the instruments were moved from the fuel tank into the fairing. The FL frame was the basis for the 1971 FX Super Glide. The FX mated the FL frame with the forks of the XL Sportster, with buckhorn handlebars and a large fiberglass tailpiece completing the Super Glide specification. The FL was given a front disc brake in 1972. The three-speed plus reverse gearbox was discontinued in 1977.

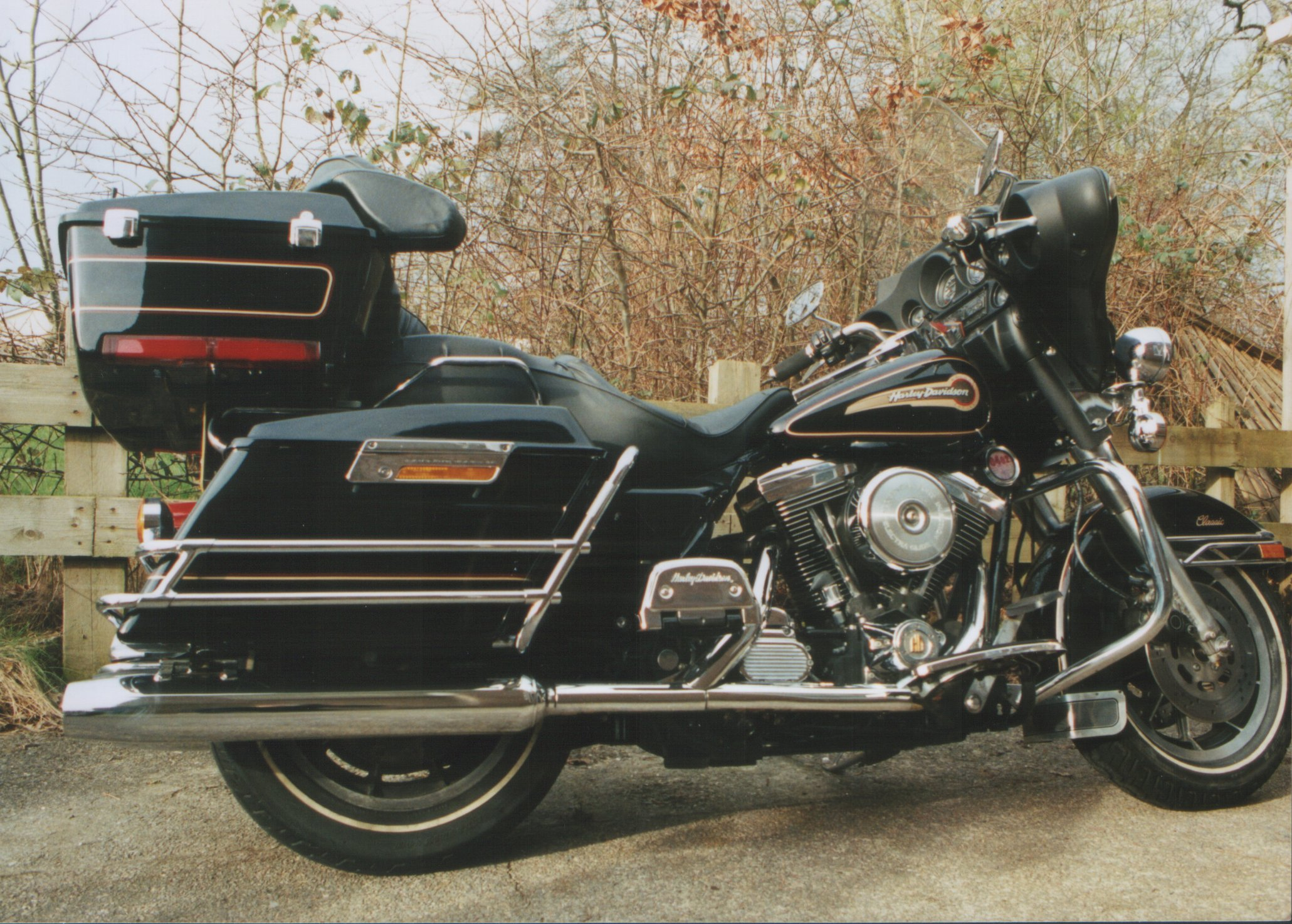
Electra Glide

A 1977 Harley-Davidson Confederate Edition of the FLH Electra Glide that featured commemorative paint and tank and fender decals was produced. The unit production was in such low volume numbers - only 44 - as to make it one of the rarest of the company's motorcycles.

An 80 cu in (1,300 cc) engine was made optional on the Electra Glide in 1978, however, the FL designation was not changed, except to FLH-80 for the 75th anniversary edition. By 1981, the 80 cubic inch engine was the standard offering; the 74 cu in (1,210 cc) engine being discontinued. The low-compression FL engine was discontinued in 1979, as was the option for hand-shift/foot-clutch transmission controls.

== Tour Glide ==
The FLT Tour Glide was introduced in 1979 as a 1980 model. Sold alongside the existing FLH Electra Glide, the FLT had a larger frame with rubber engine mounts, a five-speed transmission, the 80 cu in (1,300 cc) engine, and a frame-mounted fairing. In order that the FLT frame, which was larger and heavier than the large and heavy FLH frame, would handle acceptably, the front forks were given radical steering geometry which had them mounted behind the steering head, with the frame behind the steering head being recessed to allow adequate steering lock.

The FLHT was introduced in 1983. This was an Electra Glide based on the FLT Tour Glide frame, but using the Electra Glide "batwing" fairing instead of the Tour Glide frame-mounted fairing. The police version of the FLHT is the FLHTP.

Except for the base FLH, all 1984 FLs were equipped with the new rubber-mounted Evolution engine and a five-speed transmission.

All "Shovelhead" engines were discontinued by the 1985 model year. In that year, the four-speed solid-engine-mount FLH was modified to accept rubber mounting and the Evolution engine. The FLH was discontinued in 1986; all Touring models thereafter used the FLT/FLHT frame. The FLT Tour Glide, which introduced the current Touring frame, was dropped from the lineup in 1996. A smaller version of the frame-mounted Tour fairing would return with the FLTR Road Glide in 1998. The Evolution engine was replaced by the Twin Cam 88 engine on all large-framed Harley-Davidson motorcycles in 1999. The Twin Cam engine was enlarged from 88 cu.in. to 96 cu.in. in 2007.

== Unfaired Glides ==
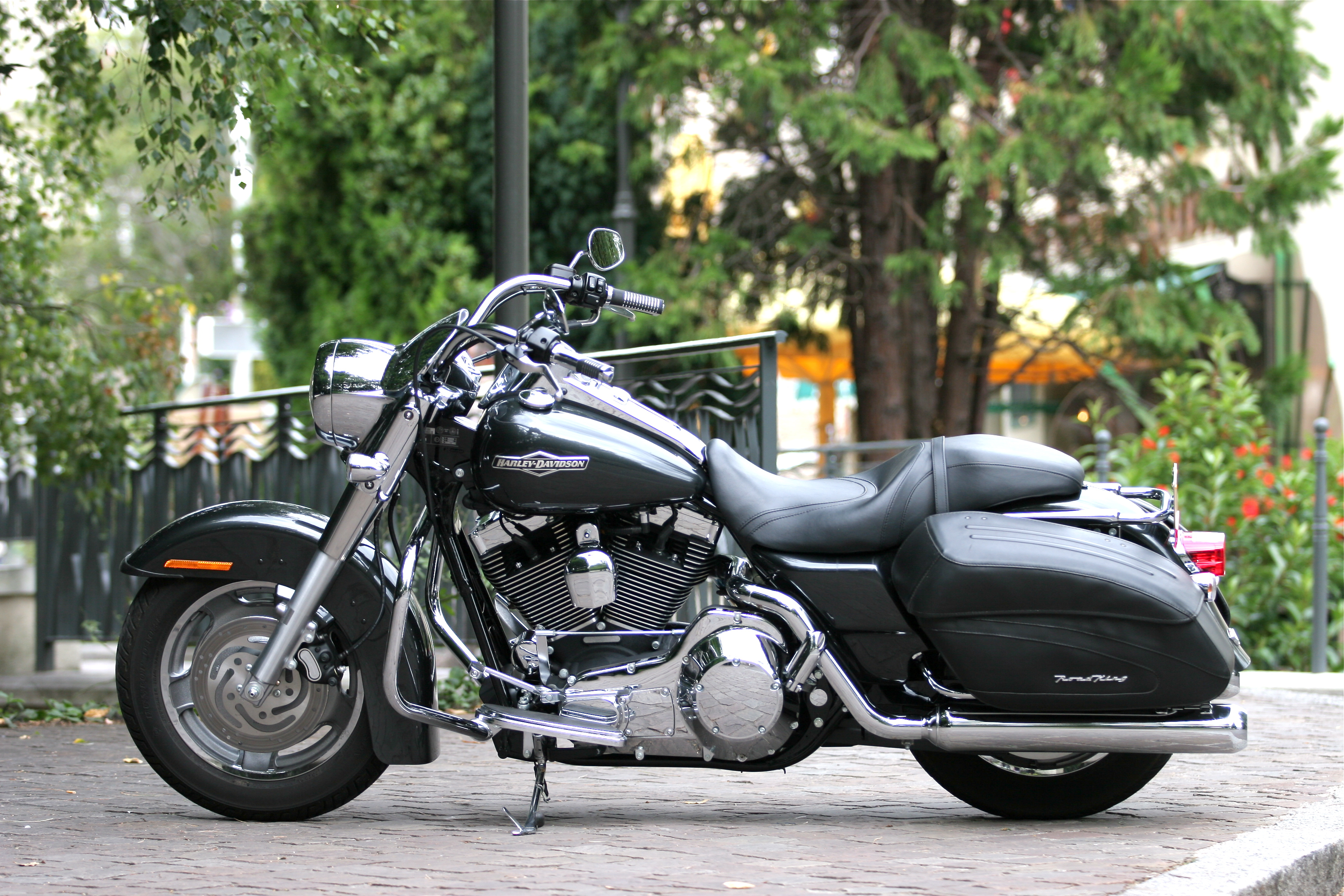
2006 Road King Custom

An unfaired version of the FLH Electra Glide, known as the FLHS Electra Glide Sport, was available from 1977 to 1984. the early versions had two into one cigar mufflers then were replaced by staggered same side duals. An unfaired FLH Electra Glide was reintroduced as the FLHS Electra Glide Sport again in 1989 through 1993, the FLHS Electra Glide Sport was eventually replaced by the FLHR Road King in 1994, which continues to the present day.

== 2009 Touring chassis ==
For the 2009 model year, Harley-Davidson redesigned the entire touring range. The changes included a new frame, new swingarm, a completely revised engine-mounting system, 17-inch front wheels for all models except the Road King Classic, a 6 US gallons (23 L; 5.0 imp gal) fuel tank, and a 2-1-2 exhaust. The changes result in greater load carrying capacity, better handling, a smoother engine, longer range and less exhaust heat transmitted to the rider and passenger.

=== Tri-Glide Ultra Classic ===
Also released in the FL Touring range for the 2009 model year was the FLHTCUTG Tri Glide Ultra Classic, the first three-wheeled Harley-Davidson since the Servi-Car was discontinued in 1973. This model features a unique frame and a 103 cid engine exclusive to the trike.

== FL Softails ==
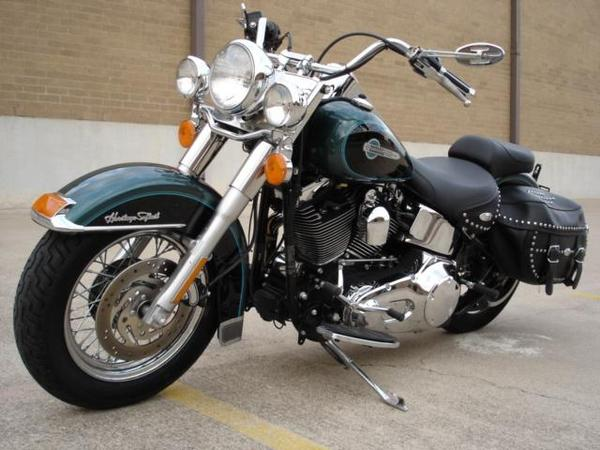
2002 FLSTC Heritage Softail Classic.

Harley-Davidson introduced the Softail chassis in 1984. The original Softails used the bare FXWG wide telescopic fork and slim 21-inch front wheel, but the FLST Heritage Softail introduced in 1986 came with a similar size but covered FL-style telescopic fork, fat-tired 16-inch wheels front and rear, and large fenders to match. The FLSTC Heritage Softail Classic, with covered front forks and retro styling, was in production by 1988.

Other Softails with big forks followed, including the 1990 introduction of the FLSTF Fat Boy and the 1993-only FLSTN "Cow Glide". The base FLST Heritage Special was discontinued in 1991. The FLSTN was continued after 1993 without the bovine motif as the Nostalgia model until 1996, it was replaced by the FLSTS Heritage Springer IN 1997. The Heritage Springer was produced through 2003, with the FLSTSC Springer Classic introduced in 2005. The Heritage Springer and Springer Classic are designated as an FL despite using Springer forks instead of the large FL telescopic forks. The first FL model, introduced in 1941, had the then-standard springer fork, with the telescopic Hydraglide taking over from 1949 onwards.

In 2000, all Softails, including the FL models, were switched from the Evolution engine to the counterbalanced Twin Cam 88B engine specially developed for the rigid engine mounting in this frame. The FLSTN designation returned in 2005 with the Softail Deluxe.

== FLD Dyna Switchback ==
Harley-Davidson introduced the FLD Dyna Switchback in 2012. Designed to be reminiscent of the late 1950s Duo Glide models, the Switchback is the first Dyna platform motorcycle from Harley-Davidson to use an FL front end, and is marketed as a convertible model, with removable saddlebags and windscreen allowing the user to easily convert the bike for touring use.

== See also ==
- List of motorcycles of the 1940s
- List of motorcycles of the 1950s
