= Harley-Davidson engine timeline =

Harley-Davidson engines are a line of engines manufactured since 1903 in Milwaukee, Wisconsin by the Harley-Davidson company for use in its motorcycles. Harley-Davidson engines are now made at Harley-Davidson Motor Company's Pilgrim Road Powertrain Operations facility in Menomonee Falls, Wisconsin.

The company's founders started making smaller flathead motorcycle engines individually by hand and fitted to bicycles in the 10-by-10-foot (3.0 m × 3.0 m) wooden barn in Milwaukee that was the Harley-Davidson workshop of the time, prior to that in 1901.

That first engine was a single cylinder model, based on the French developed De Dion-Bouton internal combustion engine.

The company was soon fully committed to producing its own proprietary engine designs, and by 1909 the first Harley-Davidson V-Twin engine had been designed and made, setting a template for engine design that continues today.

== Engine timeline ==
Harley-Davidson engines
Engine		1900s		1910s	1920s	1930s			1940s	1950s		1960s		1970s	1980s	1990s	2000s	2010s
Light engines
S											1948–1952
One-cylinder engines
27.4" F-head	1903–1905
26.8" F-head		1906–1908
30" F-head			1909–1912
35" F-head				1913–1918
37" F-head					1921–1923
21" OHV						1926–1929
21" flathead						1926–1934
30.5" flathead								1929–1934
"Hummer"												1948–1966
Topper														1960–1965
Baja 100														1969–1972
Big twin engines
F-head (IOE)					1914–1929
Flathead							1930–1948 (until 1973 in the servicar models)
Knucklehead										1936–1947
Panhead												1948–1965
Shovelhead														1966–1984
Evolution														1984–1999
Twin Cam														1999–2017
Milwaukee-Eight														2017–
Sport engines
W (opposed)					1919–1923
XA										1942
D							1929–1931
R									1932–1936
W (V twin)										1937–1952
G (W engine)										1937–1973
WR										1941–1952
K												1952–1953
KH													1954–1956
KR												1952–1969
XL Ironhead														1957–1985
XR														1970–
Evolution														1986–2022
Fluid (water)-cooled engines
Revolution														2002–2017
Revolution X														2013–
Revolution Max														2021–

Big Twin (Stock) Engine Sizes:

- Flathead W 45ci (737cc)
- Knucklehead E 60ci (983cc) & F 74ci (1212cc)
- Panhead E 60ci (983cc) & F 74ci (1212cc)
- Shovelhead 74ci (1212cc) & 80ci (1310cc)
- Evolution 82ci (1343cc)
- Twincam 88ci (1442cc) & 95ci (1556cc) (88/96ci bore 3.75in (95.25mm) & 4.00in stroke on 88ci (101.6 mm)
- Twincam 96ci (1584cc) & 103ci (1690cc)(96/103ci bore 3.875in (98.40mm) & 4.38in stroke on 96ci (111.25 mm)
- 2017-Milwaukee-Eight 107ci (1746cc) & 114ci (1868cc) & 117ci (1923cc)
- 2016-Milwaukee-Eight 114ci (1868cc)
