= S&S Cycle =

US motorcycle parts manufacturer

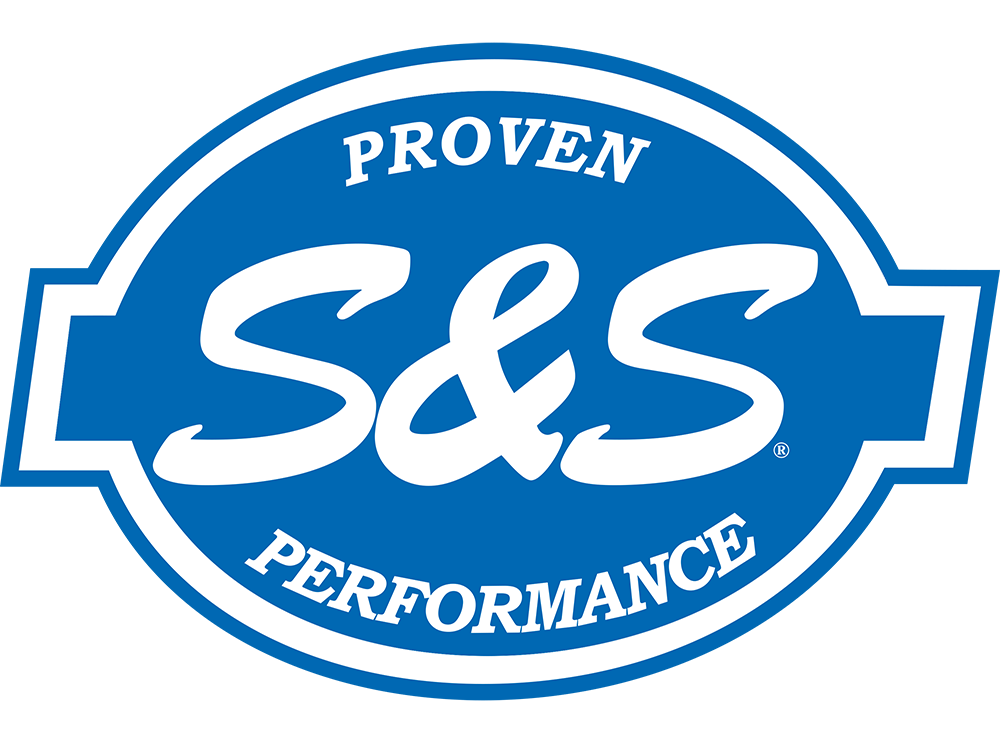
- Type: Private
- Founded: 1958
- Founder: George J. Smith and Stanley Stankos
- Headquarters: Viola, Wisconsin
- Key people: George J. Smith, Marjorie Smith, Stanley Stankos
- Products: Motorcycle engines
- Website: www.sscycle.com

S&S Cycle is an American motorcycle engine and parts engineer and manufacturer. The company was founded in 1958 by George J. Smith and Stanley Stankos in Blue Island, Illinois. The company started by selling high performance pushrods for Harley-Davidson motorcycles, and today they still make parts for a variety of V-Twin bikes. The company's current president is Paul Skarie.

== History ==
Soon after the formation of S&S, George's wife, Marjorie, bought out Stanley Stankos and Smith & Stankos became Smith & Smith. In 1969, the company moved from Blue Island to establish a new headquarters in Viola, Wisconsin. S&S still operates at this location, but opened an additional facility in La Crosse, Wisconsin in 2004.

In July 2007 S&S purchased the Flathead Power (FHP) brand name and intellectual property (trademarks, patents and designs) along with the remaining inventory of parts and tooling and is continuing the vintage brand; the brand was resold in 2014 to the original owner.

In June 2008, the company held its 50th anniversary celebration in La Crosse. Over 28,000 motorcycle enthusiasts attended the celebration, according to the La Crosse Tribune.

=== Copying controversy ===
S&S attracted controversy in 2005 when Harley-Davidson filed a patent and trademark infringement lawsuit against the company along with fellow aftermarket engine manufacturer Delkron, Inc. Harley accused S&S and Delkron of copying parts for Twin Cam engines and using Harley trademarks without permission. S&S argued that the suit was without any legal basis, and asserted that "a mutually beneficial relationship existed" between them and Harley.

== Engine technology ==
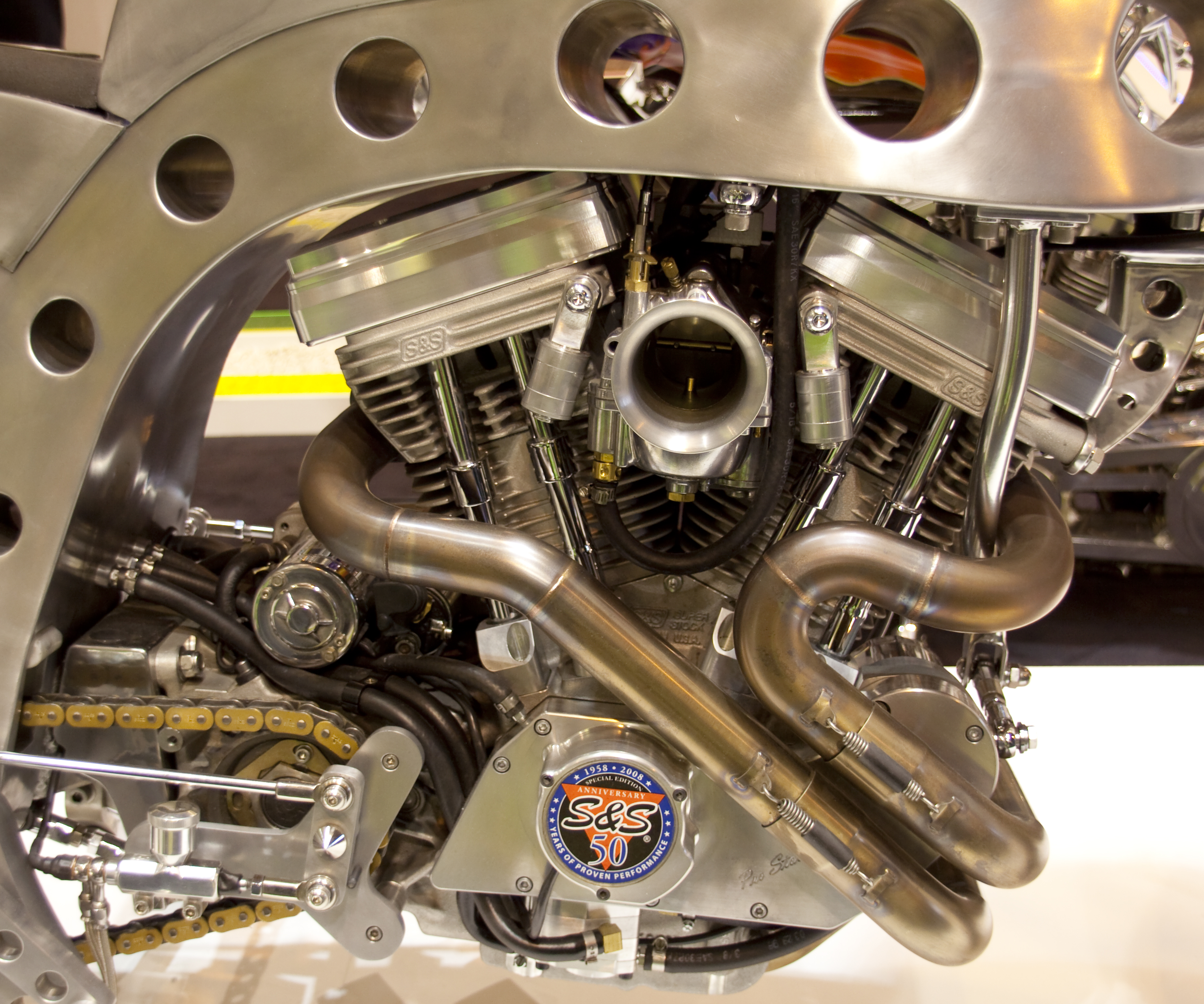
S&S engine

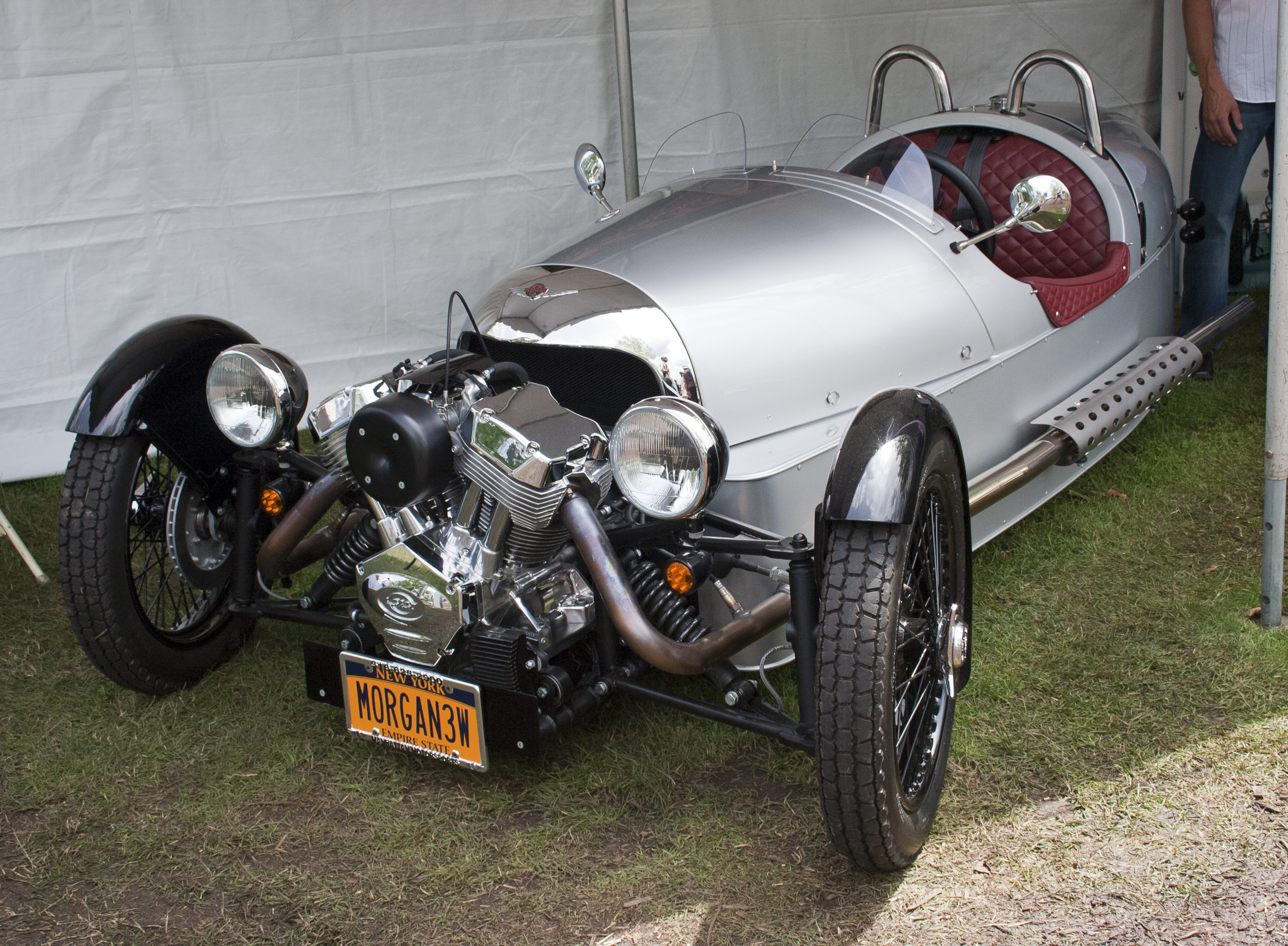
2012 model year Morgan three wheeler with S&S engine at the front

S&S Cycle develops performance replacement engines for V-twin motorcycles, most of which are replacement engines for Harley-Davidson models and are manufactured in the United States. In addition, S&S Cycle developed their own proprietary pushrod V-twin engine, dubbed the X-Wedge that features a 56° cylinder angle instead of the 45° angle used in Harley-Davidson V-twin engines, and which was developed with the custom motorcycle builder (OEM) in mind. The X-Wedge is the basis for the engine from a number of high end motorcycle manufacturers such as Confederate Motorcycle. The X-Wedge recently found a different kind of application, having been chosen to be the power plant utilized by Morgan Motor company, based in Worcestershire, England, for their development of the Morgan 3 wheeled car.

S&S was the first motorcycle engine manufacturer to produce pre-certified United States Environmental Protection Agency compliant engines, lifting the burden and cost of performing the complicated EPA testing procedures from the companies and enthusiasts who buy S&S engines. The company also produces TÜV certified engines, and has even succeeded in complying with California's emissions requirements. S&S and V-Twin Manufacturing are the only motorcycle companies in the world to manufacture Knucklehead, Shovelhead, Panhead, Evolution-style engines and Twin-cam style engines. S&S manufactures the largest (143 cu in (2,340 cc)) engine to fit a stock Harley-Davidson frame.

== Applications ==
- Morgan 3-Wheeler, used S&S V-twin (2011-2021 ).
- Wakan 1640 motorcycle with 100 cubic inch S&S V-Twin
- S&S Dragon T141
