= Ironhead =

Ironhead may refer to:

- Dale Earnhardt, American race car driver nicknamed "Ironhead"
- Craig Heyward, American football player nicknamed "Ironhead"
- Ironhead Airport, airport at Sanger, Denton County, Texas, United States
- Pandulf Ironhead (died 981), Prince of Benevento and Capua
- Harley-Davidson Ironhead engine, a motorcycle engine produced by Harley-Davidson between 1957 and 1985
- "Iron Head", a song from the Rob Zombie album The Sinister Urge
- Ironhead Studio, a costume and art studio that designs many different costumes for American comic book based films.
