= Harley-Davidson Super Glide =

Type of motorcycle

The Harley-Davidson Super Glide was a motorcycle made by the Harley-Davidson. Reputed to be the first factory custom motorcycle, it originated Harley-Davidson's FX series of motorcycles by mating Sportster components, most notably the front end, with the chassis of their larger big twin motorcycles. Super Glide models from 1991 to 2018 were based on the Dyna Glide chassis which has a wider variety of front ends and trim levels, and for a time filled the intermediate niche between the smallest and largest Harley-Davidson models; the Dyna platform has since been discontinued for the 2018 model year in favor of the new Softail frame, with some models from the Dyna nameplate being carried over to the Softail line.

== History ==
=== 1971 FX Super Glide ===
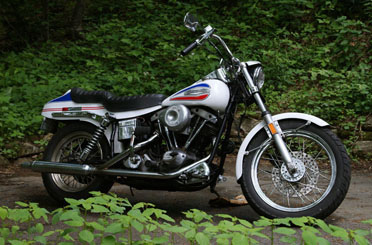
1971 FX Super Glide

From 1934 to 1970, with the exception of the Servi-Car, there have been two distinct lines of V-Twin Harley-Davidson motorcycles, the small twins and the big twins. However, individual bikers would sometimes customize bikes by changing parts around or cutting and rewelding frames and other components to suit their tastes.

Harley-Davidson styling director Willie G. Davidson was aware of this phenomenon and decided to design a motorcycle for production that would have the look of the custom bikes. To accomplish this, he started with the frame and rear suspension, but not the electric starter, from the FLH Electra Glide, to which he then mated the smaller telescopic forks from the XLH Sportster. This combination was referred to as the FX chassis, where "FX" meant "Factory Experimental", The drivetrain and engine accessories were from the FLH, the front headlights and brakes were from the XLH. This use of a mixture of FL and XL parts has also been used to explain the FX designation. To complete the Super Glide, he added buckhorn handlebars and a "boattail" tail/fender unit similar to those being used on the XLH Sportster.

The production FX Super Glide was released in 1971 to a lukewarm reception. Particularly not well received was the "boattail", which also proved to be unpopular on the Sportsters that had it. Sales of both models improved when less radical rear styling was made available.

=== Variations of the FX Super Glide ===
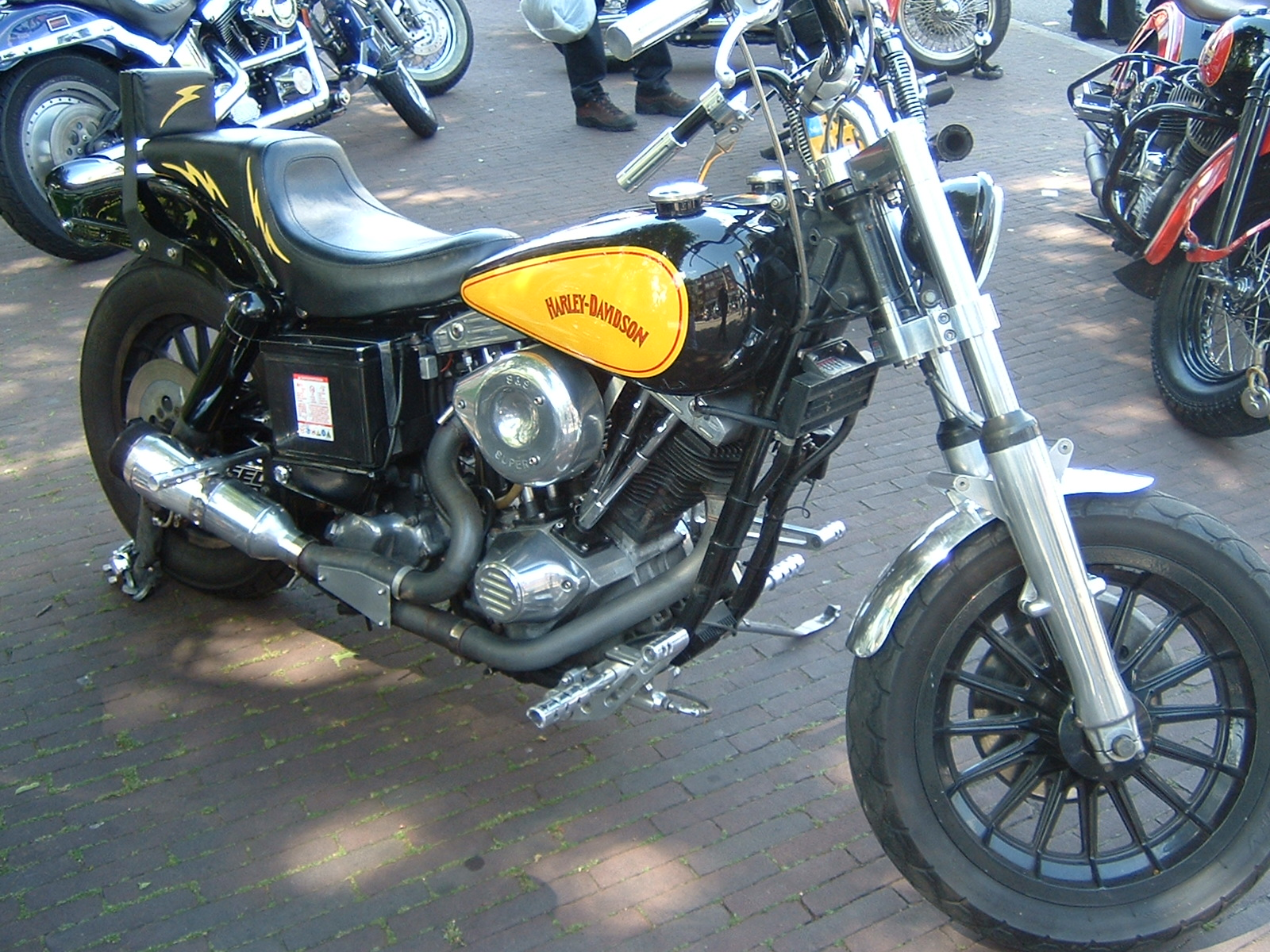
Customized Shovelhead FX variant

In 1974, the FX was joined by the FXE, a version of the Super Glide with an electric starter. Both versions also got an exclusive one-piece tank instead of the Fat Bob tank used by the FL.

In 1977, the FXS Low Rider was introduced. The Low Rider had alloy wheels front and rear, two disc brakes on the front wheel, extended forks with a 32° rake, and a 26" seat height. Unlike the Super Glide, the Low Rider was an instant hit; outselling all other Harley-Davidson models in its first full year of production. All three FX models returned to using Fat Bob tanks, but with a special center divider that included a tachometer.

A 1977 Harley-Davidson Confederate Edition of the Super Glide that had commemorative paint and tank and fender decals was produced but in such low volume numbers - only 228 units - as to make it one of the rarest of the company's motorcycles.

The base, kickstart-only FX was discontinued in 1979. In that year, the FXEF Fat Bob was introduced. The following year would bring the FXB Sturgis, an all-black Low Rider with primary and secondary belt drives, and the FXWG Wide Glide, a Low Rider with wide forks and a flame pattern painted on the tank.

In 1983, the Low Rider was converted from chain drive to belt drive and given the designation FXSB, at which point the FXB was discontinued. In the same year, the FXDG Disc Glide was introduced. This model had a disc-type rear wheel instead of the wire-spoked wheel of the Super Glide or the solid-spoked wheel of the Low Rider.

The FXE Super Glide was discontinued in 1985, with the FXEF Fat Bob becoming the base model. The 1985 FXEF was the first and last FXEF to have the Evo motor along with being the last year for the 4sp and chain drive.

In 1986, all FX-based bikes except the Wide Glide were supplanted by FXR-based bikes. The Wide Glide was discontinued the following year as the new line of Softail models provides chopper-like looks.

=== FXR ===
The FXR and FXRS Super Glide II were introduced in 1982 and sold alongside the existing FX models. The FXR was the base model with solid black paint and laced wheels. The FXRS was the deluxe model with two tone paint, lowered suspension, mag wheels and a backrest. The FXR chassis was essentially an FLT Tour Glide chassis with slightly bigger diameter frame tubes and a more conventional design around the steering head. As such, it had a rubber-mounted engine and a five-speed transmission, as opposed to the solid mounting and four-speed transmission of the original FX chassis.

The next year Harley introduced the FXRT Sport Glide in 1983, a Super Glide variant with a fairing and saddlebags. Upon the discontinuation of the corresponding FX-based models, the FXR Super Glide II became the FXR Super Glide and the FXRS Low Glide became the FXRS Low Rider. The Wide Glide was discontinued because the FXR frame was not suitable for the wide forks.

The 1984 Disc Glide as it was known was a very rare motorcycle. It had the first Chrome Package: chrome rocker boxes, nose cone, and primary cover. It was called the FXRSDG.

== Dyna ==
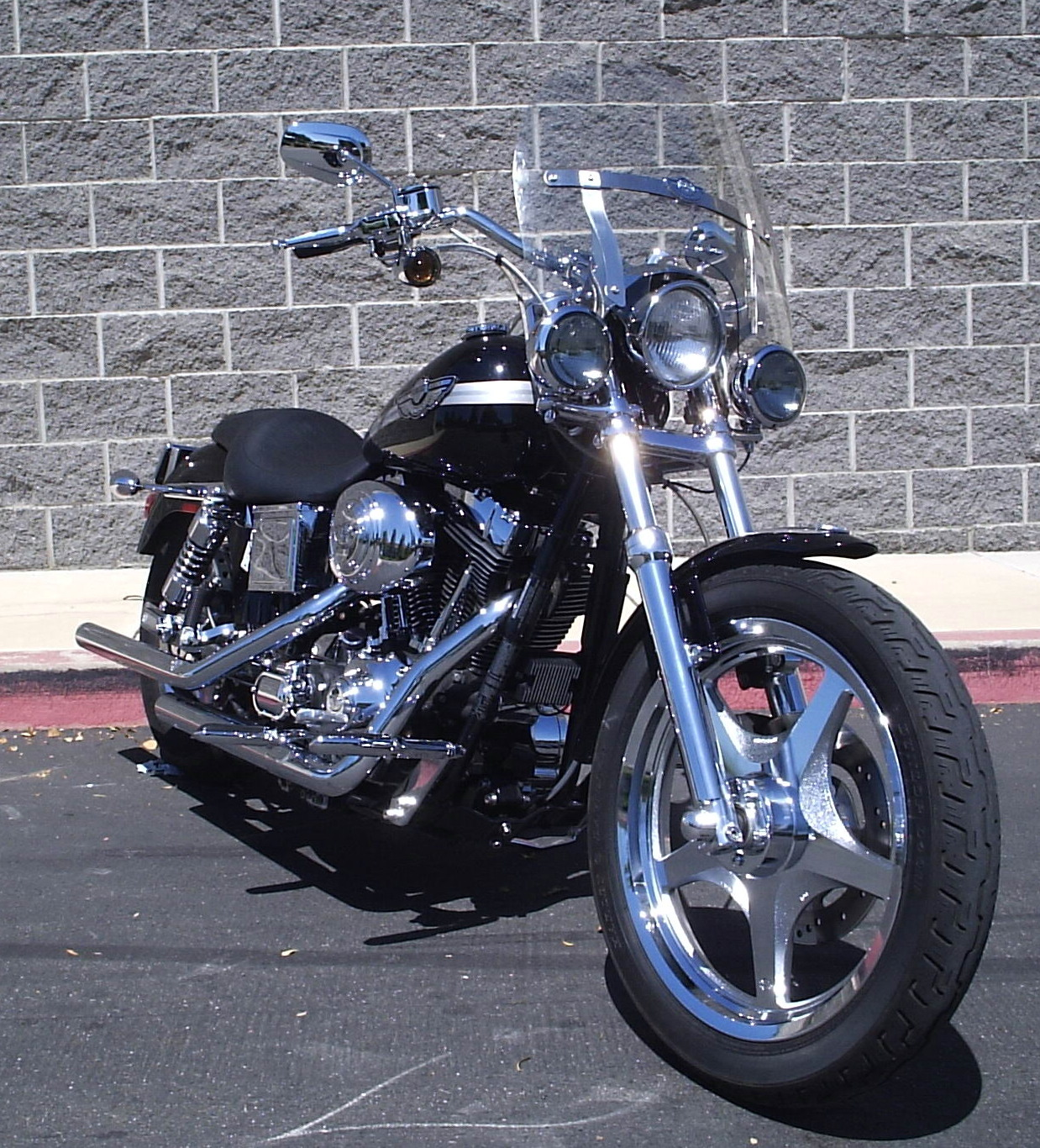
100th Anniversary H-D Dyna Low Rider (FXDL), 2003

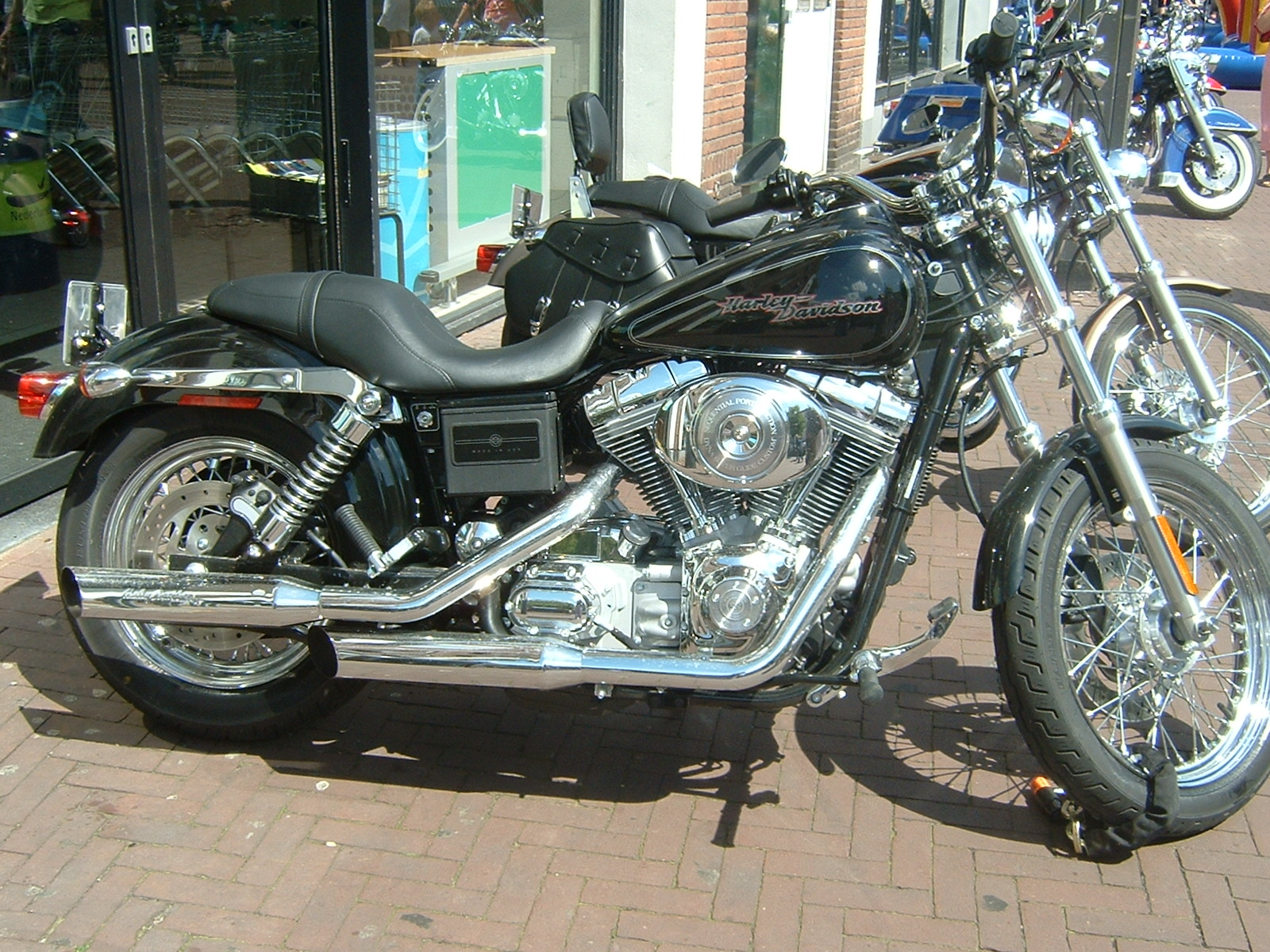
2005 Dyna Super Glide Custom

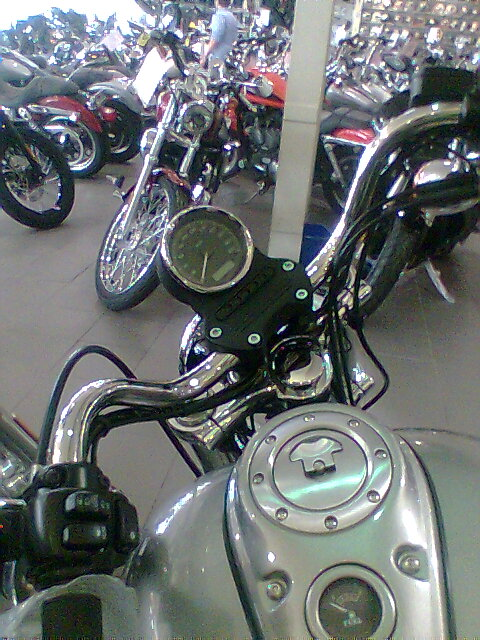
Controls of a 2008 Harley-Davidson FXD Superglide

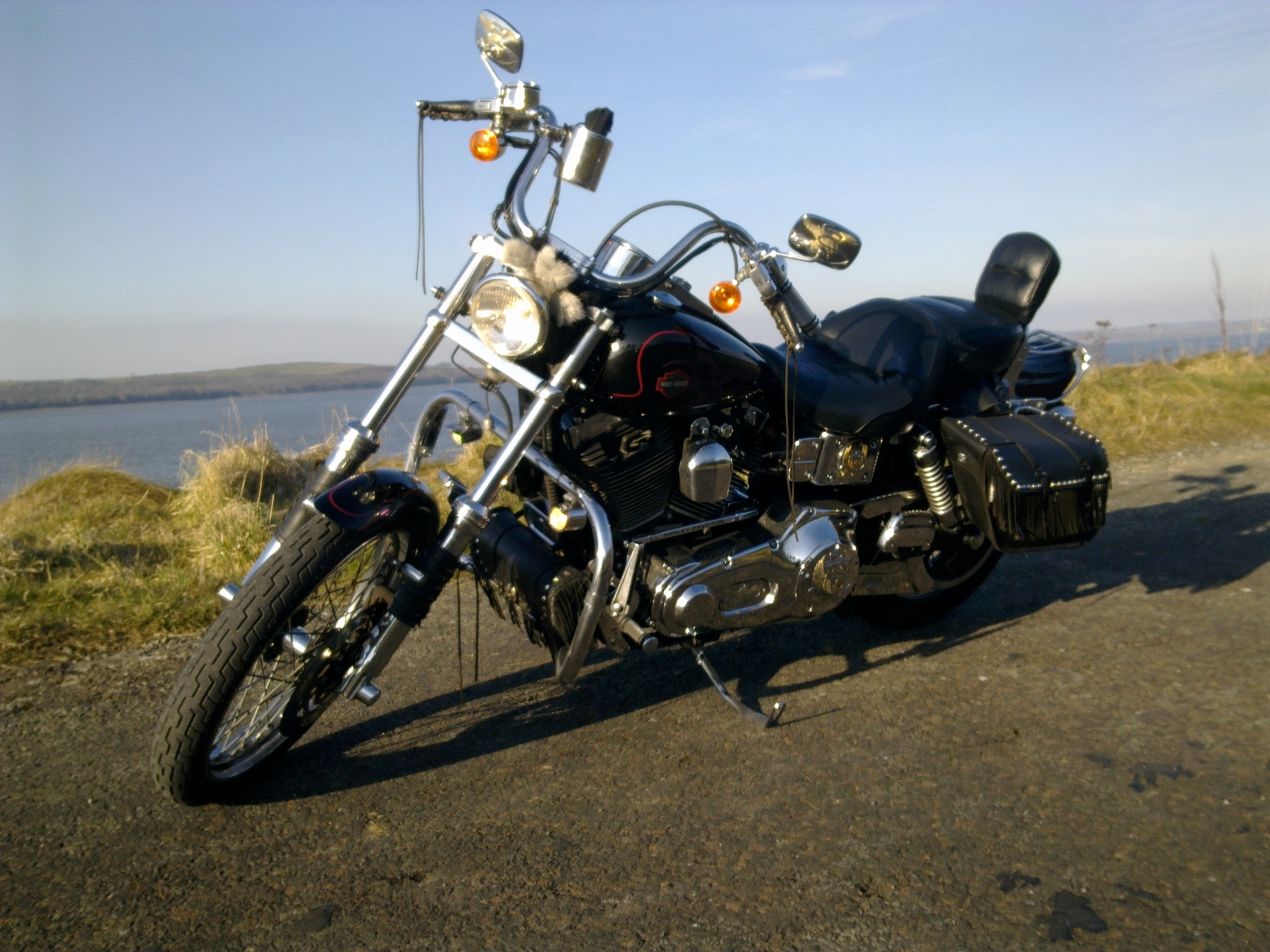
Dyna Wide Glide Twin Cam 88

Design work began on the replacement for the FXR chassis shortly after the first FXR bikes were sold. The Dyna chassis was introduced in 1991 with a limited-production FXDB Sturgis model. The engine mounting system was changed from three rubber mounts to two, resulting in poorer vibration control, but speedier production on the assembly line.

The Sturgis was followed in 1992 by the limited-edition FXDB Daytona. Also introduced in 1992 was the FXDC Dyna Glide Custom. Apart from the paint scheme, the Dyna Glide Custom was virtually identical to the Daytona. Dyna Customs were all painted black and silver, and the early models had a silver powder coat on the frame. Later production units had a black frame.

In 1993 the faired and bagged FXRT Sport Glide was discontinued and the FXRS Low Rider was displaced by the FXDL Dyna Low Rider, although the FXR, FXLR, FXRS-Conv Convertible and the FXRS-SP Low Rider Sport continued to be sold. The FXDWG Dyna Wide Glide was introduced in the same year. The Low Rider Sport was discontinued in 1994, and the Low Rider was discontinued after the 2009 model year.

Between the 1991 introduction of the Dyna chassis and the end of the 1994 model year, all Dyna models had a 32° rake. In 1995 the FXD Dyna Super Glide and the FXDS-Conv Dyna Glide Convertible were introduced. These Dynas had a 28° rake and replaced the FXR Super Glide and the FXLR Low Rider Custom, which were the last FXR models in regular production.

The FXDX Super Glide Sport was introduced in 1999. The first blacked out Dyna with dual front disc brakes, tach/speedometer (the iconic mickey mouse ears) at the handlebars and higher rear end. In 2000 it got fully adjustable rear and front suspension. The FXDX-T Super Glide T-Sport, with a detachable fork mounted fairing and improved detachable saddlebags, replaced the FXDS-Conv Dyna Convertible in 2001, and was discontinued in 2003.

The FXDC returned to the line in 2005 as the Super Glide Custom.

In 2006, a new Dyna chassis was introduced along with a new six-speed transmission. In the same year new models were the FXDBI Street Bob (a minimal, single seat Dyna Glide motorcycle available in the new 'denim' (matte) black color) and the limited edition FXDI35 35th Anniversary Super Glide (colored to resemble the original white 1971 Super Glide). The FXDX Super Glide Sport was discontinued.

In 2007, the Twin Cam 88 engine was replaced by the fuel-injected 1584 cc Twin Cam 96 engine across the entire Harley-Davidson Big Twin lineup, including the FXD series. The 'I' model designator was dropped for all models, since all Big Twins from then on had fuel injection.

The FXDF Fat Bob was introduced in 2008. In the same year, the FXDWG Wide Glide was sold as a limited edition 105th Anniversary model before being retired, re-emerging in 2010 with a different (bobber) rear treatment. 2010 also saw the discontinuation of the FXD base model (replaced by the FXDB) and the loss of the FXDL Low Rider. 2012 saw some Dynas obtain the TC103 engine, available in the FXDF and FXDWG models as well as the new FLD Switchback, a sport-tourer. A revised version of the FXDL Low Rider returned in mid 2014, and replaced the FXDC Super Glide Custom in the line up. Midway through 2016 Harley-Davidson released a special edition FXDLS Dyna Low Rider S with the Screaming Eagle 110 cubic-inch engine, dual front disks, and electronic cruise control.

Harley-Davidson discontinued the Dyna platform in 2017 for the 2018 model year, having been replaced by a completely-redesigned Softail chassis. Some of the existing models previously released by the company under the Dyna nameplate have since been carried over to the new Softail line.
