= Orlebar Brown =

British clothing brand

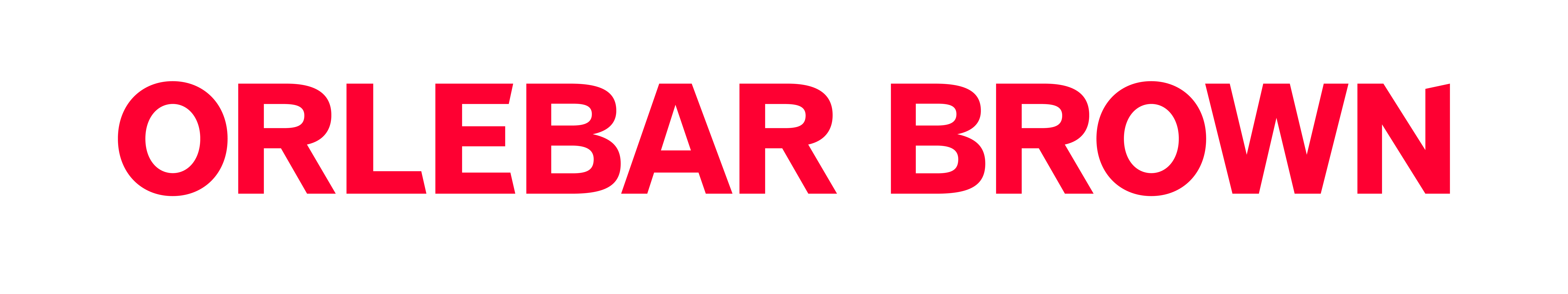
- Industry: Fashion
- Founded: 2007
- Founder: Adam Brown and Julia Simpson-Orlebar
- Headquarters: UK, London
- Number of locations: 50 (2025)
- Products: Clothing
- Parent: Chanel
- Website: www.orlebarbrown.com

Orlebar Brown is a British clothing brand specialising in tailored men's swim shorts. The company was founded by Adam Brown and Julia Simpson-Orlebar in 2007, and acquired by Chanel in 2018. Orlebar Brown is directed by Adam Brown and CEO Paul Donoghue, and is based in West London.

== Products ==
Orlebar Brown specialises in men's swim shorts based on the 17-piece pattern of a pair of traditional men's suit trousers. They feature a four-part shaped waistband, zip fly closure and side fasteners.The Italian zippers on the fly and the back pocket are applied by hand, although the pocket itself and darts are machine applied.

While Orlebar Brown is best known for its swimwear, 55 percent of the company's sales are from its other products, including rash guards, shorts, polo shirts, long and short sleeve shirts, jumpers, sweatshirts and waterproof shoes.

== Digital ==
The company has an app, #SnapShorts, which allows customers to design their own swim shorts by uploading a photograph. Their design can be made into a bespoke pair of shorts or shared on social media.

== History ==
In the summer of 2006, Adam Brown had the idea for Orlebar Brown on holiday in India and decided to partner with an old acquaintance, Julia Simpson-Orlebar, to launch the brand.

The Orlebar Brown website officially launched in March 2007, available in 105 countries.

Simpson-Orlebar left the business amicably in 2008, but she remains a shareholder.

In 2011, the Orlebar Brown US website was launched, expanding the company internationally. As of 2015, 30 percent of their sales come from the US.

In August 2013, Orlebar Brown raised £8 million (US$12.4 million) from the private-equity firm Piper, in exchange for a minority stake, and appointed Paul Donoghue as global commercial director. In 2014, the business made £12m, a rise from the £7m the year before. The brand was expected to reach £20 million (about US$28.8 million) in revenue in 2016.

In September 2018, it was announced that Chanel had acquired the company; Brown retained his role as creative director.

== Online and offline presence ==
=== Physical shops ===
Orlebar Brown opened their first shop on Ledbury Road in Notting Hill, London in 2011.

They now have shops in Notting Hill, Mayfair, Canary Wharf, Wimbledon, Sloane Avenue, Harrods and Bicester Village.

Orlebar Brown also has a physical international presence with shops in Cannes and St Tropez in France, Mykonos in Greece, Soho and East Hampton in New York City, Miami and Palm Beach, Turkey, Noosa, Bondi Beach and Brisbane in Australia, Kuwait and Dubai.

As well as multiple physical shops and an online presence, Orlebar Brown also has over 300 wholesale accounts, including Selfridges, Bergdorf Goodman and Barneys New York and franchises around the world

=== Infrastructure ===
Orlebar Brown's headquarters and offices are located in West London. In 2013, they appointed Torque, a logistics company, to manage all of their European distribution. Orlebar Brown operates a 550,000 square feet distribution center in Wortley, Leeds.

Orlebar Brown's swim shorts are made in Portugal by the factory Petratex, where they pass through a minimum of 12-stage manufacturing process.

== Brand collaborations ==
Orlebar Brown has collaborated with several brands such as Mandarin Oriental, Atlantis the Royal, Lamborghini, and James Bond to create limited edition clothing and swimwear inspired by the brands.

The brand has also acted as an inspiration in its own right for multiple brands including Morgan, collaborating on their Super 3, and IWC to create a special edition of their Portugieser Yacht Club.

== Legal issues ==
In 2024, male model Andrew Cooper initiated legal action against Orlebar Brown for £4 million, claiming that he sustained a brain injury whilst filming an advert for the brand in Puglia, Italy.

== In media ==
Orlebar Brown has a longstanding relationship with the James Bond franchise, with the brand first appearing in the 2012 film Skyfall. The character also wore clothing from the brand in the 2021 film No Time to Die, as well as in the video game 007: First Light.

Shirts from the brand also appeared in the third season of the HBO series, the White Lotus.
