= S&S =

S&S may refer to:

- Sense and Sensibility, a novel by Jane Austen
- Salt and Sanctuary, a video game
- Sword and sorcery, a subgenre of fantasy and historical fantasy
- Simon & Schuster, a publisher
- S&S Cycle, a manufacturer of aftermarket engine parts and proprietary engines
- S&S Worldwide, a designer and builder of amusement park rides, including roller coasters
- Sparkman & Stephens, a yacht design firm founded by Olin Stephens
- Steel & Sons Cup, Northern Irish football cup competition
