= Shovelhead =

Shovelhead may refer to:

- Harley-Davidson Shovelhead engine, an engine produced by Harley-Davidson from 1966 to 1984
- Bonnethead, the bonnethead shark, Sphyrna tiburo
