= Joe Petrali =

American motorcycle racer

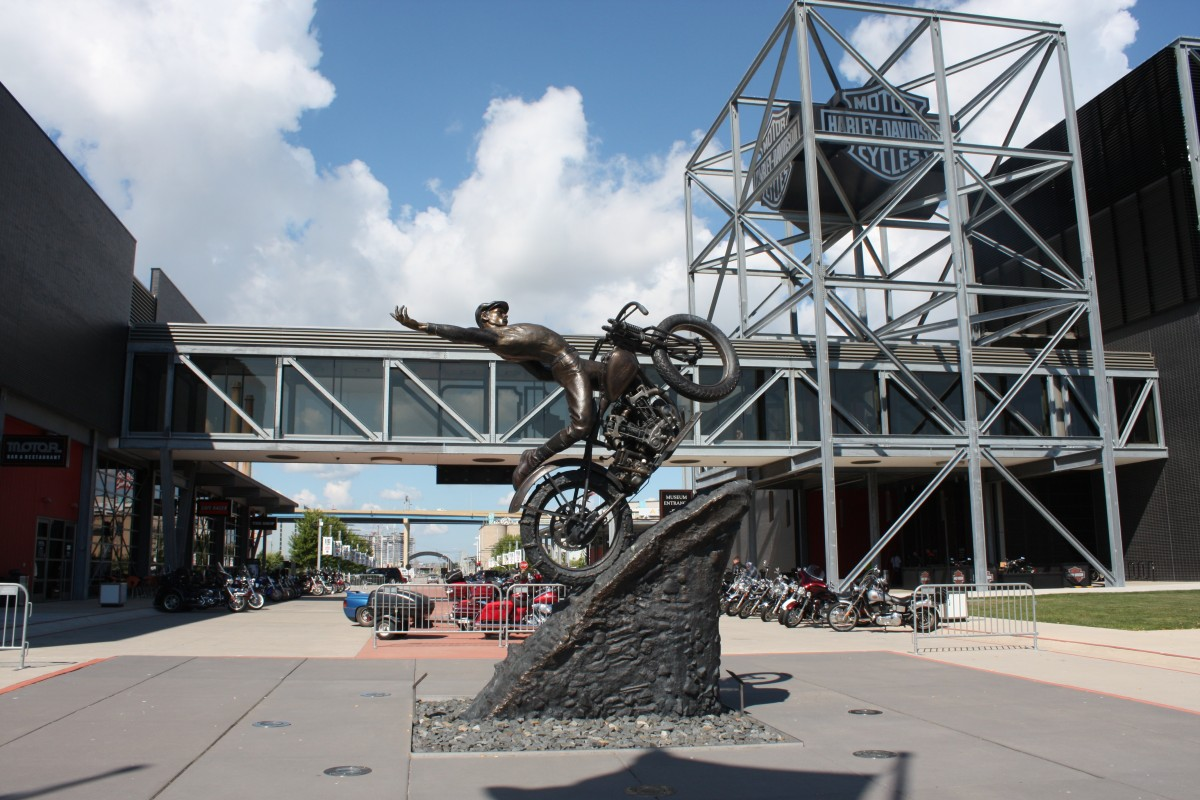
- Harley Museum Milwaukee Motorcycle Sky
- Born: February 22, 1904; San Francisco
- Died: November 10, 1973 (aged 69); Casa Grande, Arizona
- Occupation: Motorcyclist

"Smokey'" Joe Petrali (February 22, 1904 – November 10, 1973) was an American motorcycle racer, active in the 1920s and 1930s. Petrali was a Class A racing champion who competed in board-track and dirt-track racing circuits, speed records, and hillclimbs. Petrali won a record 49 American Motorcyclist Association national championship races, with his last coming on August 29, 1937. The record stood for 55 years until broken by Scott Parker in 1992.

== Biography ==
=== Early life ===
Petrali was born in San Francisco, California, on February 22, 1904. Petrali's affection for motorcycles began growing up in California as a child, he would watch the Class A racers of the 1910s, such as Charles “Fearless" Balke, who wore leather pants and puttees while racing to keep his legs from burning and Don Johns. He later adopted the style and began to wear similar leather pants and puttees throughout his career.

At the age of 14, Petrali gained his first national victory when he entered an economy run held at the California State Fairgrounds in Sacramento. He continued to participate more endurance runs for three more years. He participated in an endurance run that was recognized as a record, He entered a marathon event that took three days and four nights. After all the other riders dropped out, the race was considered as a tie between Petrali and his boss Archie Rife.

In 1937 over the sand of Daytona Beach, Florida, Petrali set a world motorcycle speed record of 136.183 mph with an experimental streamlined 61 cubic inch OHV Harley Model E, later called the Harley-Davidson Knucklehead engine. The clocking has never been topped on sand although the speed mark was bettered 11 years later.

=== Later life ===
In 1925, Petrali won the National Board Track Championship and in 1926 he won two nationals using a Harley-Davidson. On August 13, 1927, Eddie Brinck was racing at Springfield, Massachusetts and his front tire blew out and hit Petrali causing him to be flung 15 feet into the air. Brinck suffered severe injuries and later died, Petrali also was impacted by injures but none as fatal as Brincks and Petrali only recovered a year later and began to start participating in events again but less frequently.

Petrali set his first land speed record on March 13, 1937, at Daytona Beach, reaching speed of 136.183 mph. Petrali held the record for 11 years on September 13, 1948, by Rollie Free who rode a Vincent HRD (Black Shadow or Black Lightning) to a speed of 150.313 mph at Bonneville Salt Flats, Utah.

=== Death ===
Petrali died from a heart attack on November 10, 1973, in Casa Grande, Arizona, performing an economy run.

=== Awards ===
Petrali was inducted into the Motorsports Hall of Fame of America in 1992.

In 1998, Petrali was inducted into the AMA Motorcycle Hall of fame, and in 2006, he was inducted into the National Italian American Sports Hall of Fame.
