= Morgan 3-Wheeler =

Morgan 3 Wheeler
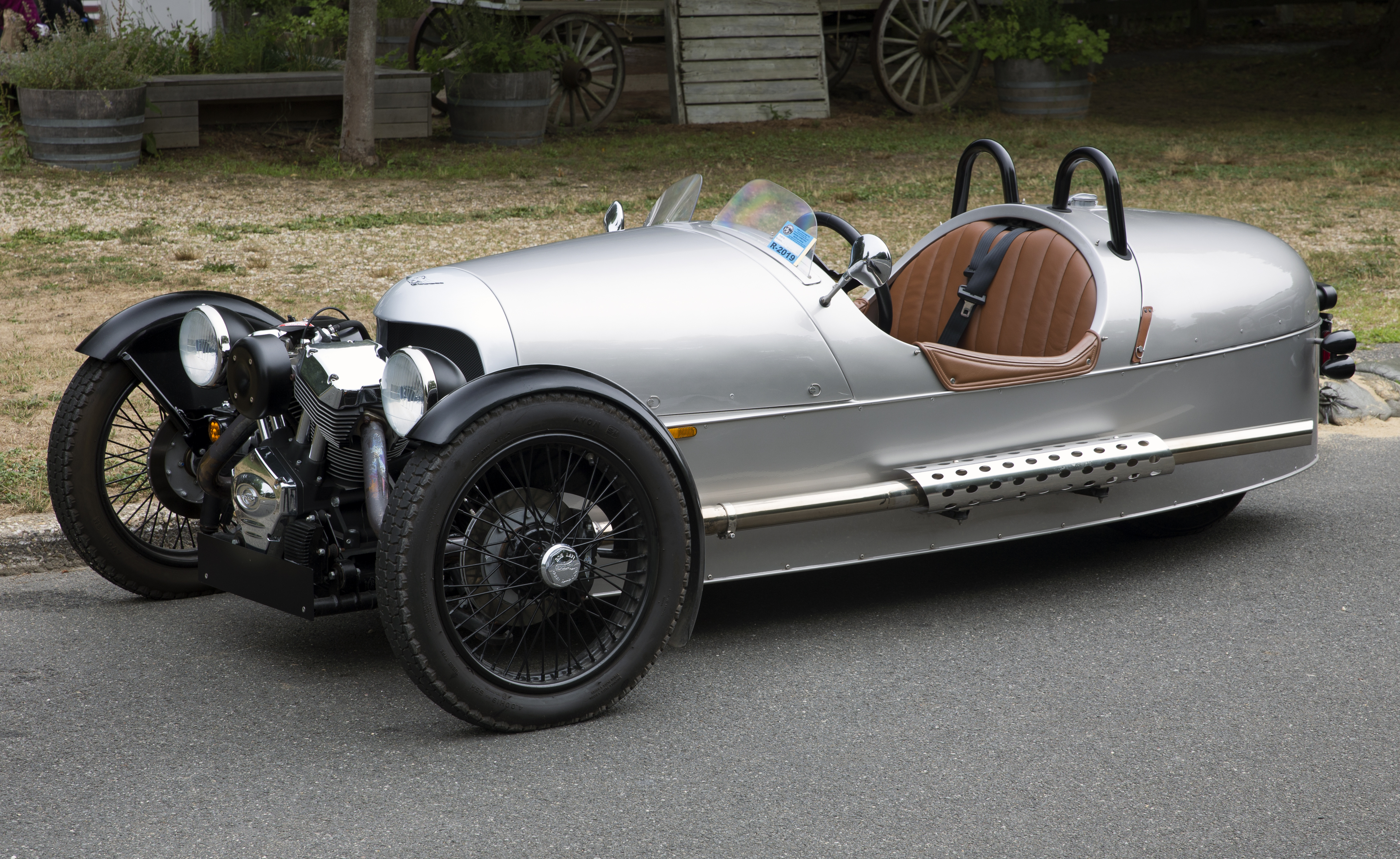
- 2012 Morgan 3 Wheeler, US-spec

Overview
- Manufacturer: Morgan Motor Company
- Production: 2012–2021
- Model years: 2013-2021 (U.S.)
- Assembly: United Kingdom: Malvern Link, Worcestershire

Body and chassis
- Class: Three-wheeler, Sports car
- Body style: 2 seat, Roadster
- Layout: FR layout

Powertrain
- Engine: S&S 1983 cc ohv V-twin
- Transmission: Mazda 5-speed manual with torque damper

Dimensions
- Wheelbase: 92 in (2,336.8 mm)
- Length: 126 in (3,200.4 mm)

Chronology
- Predecessor: Morgan F-Series
- Successor: Morgan Super 3

The Morgan 3 Wheeler is a three-wheeled roadster produced by British manufacturer Morgan Motor Company from 2012 to 2021. It was unveiled at the 2011 Geneva Motor Show.

== Technical ==
The 3 Wheeler was initially said to have a Harley-Davidson Screaming Eagle V-twin engine and a Mazda 5-speed manual transmission, and was estimated to deliver 115 hp (86 kW) at the rear wheel. However, there was a surprise when the prototype that was shown at Geneva had an S&S engine. Production three-wheelers turned out to have S&S engines. The kerb weight was originally estimated to be less than 500 kg (1,102 lb), but the final weight was tested at 550 kg (1,212 lb). The acceleration from zero to 60 mph (97 km/h) was estimated by Morgan as 4.5 seconds, with an (estimated) top speed of 115 mph (185 km/h). The three-wheeler was homologated as a motorcycle in the United States.

== Orders and deliveries ==
The company states that 850 deposits have been taken since the announcement in 2011. Customer deliveries began in Europe in February 2012. USA deliveries were in June 2012, when the first imported three-wheeler was displayed in New York City and at the Greenwich Concours d'Elegance.

== Appearances on Top Gear ==
The Morgan 3 Wheeler was featured in a Series 18 episode of UK motoring show Top Gear where presenter Richard Hammond picked the Morgan 3 Wheeler in a comparison of track-day cars. The 3 Wheeler won the "Not-A-Car of the Year 2011" in Top Gear.

== Successor model ==
The current generation model of the Morgan 3 Wheeler ended production in summer 2021 with a run-out version called the P101. It was replaced by the Morgan Super 3 in 2022.

== Electric variant ==
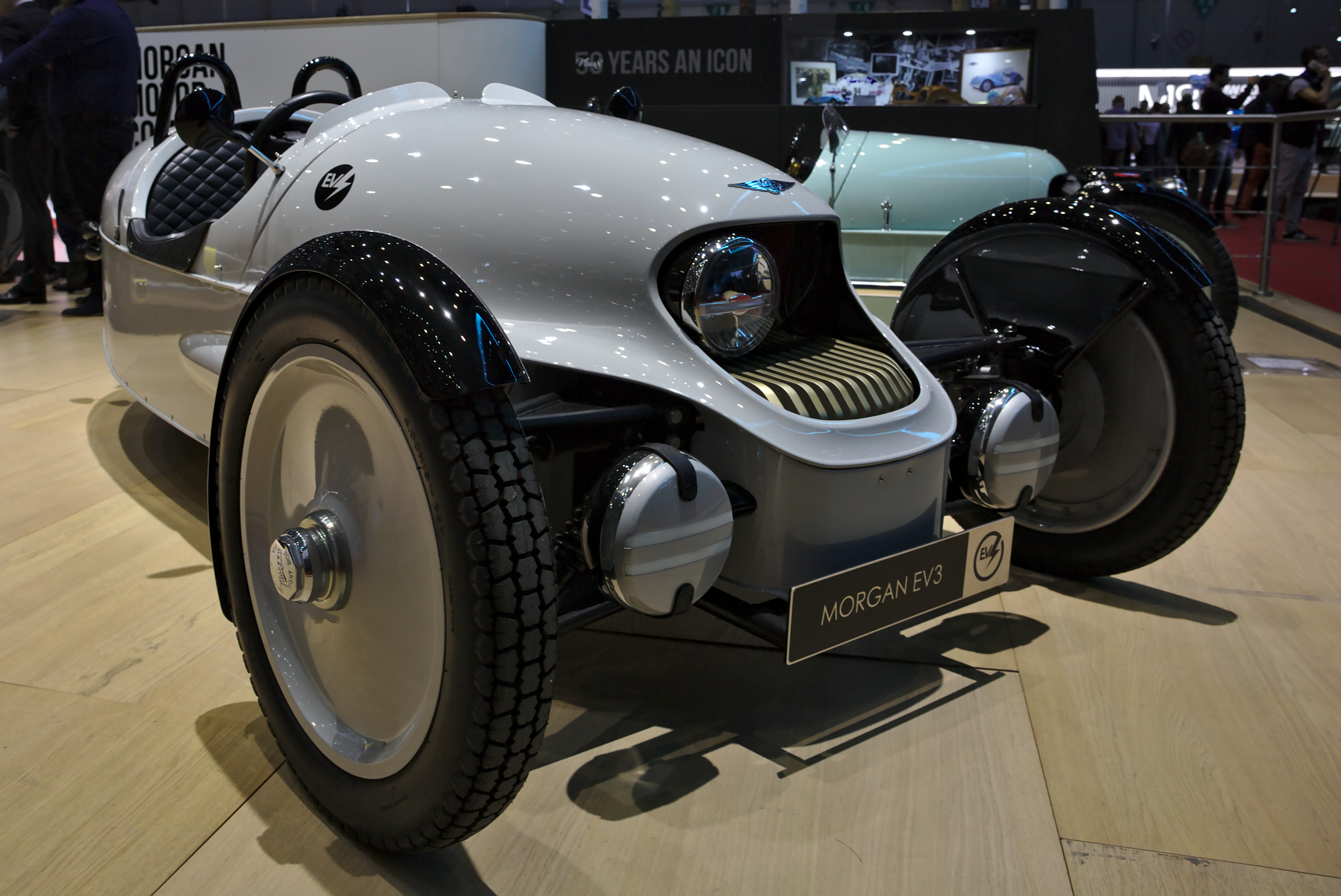
Morgan Threewheeler EV3 at Geneva Motor Show, 6 March 2018

Morgan was working on an electric prototype version of the Three Wheeler called the “EV3”. The electric motor was rated at 101 bhp, and was estimated to produce 150 miles of range (240 km) with a 20 kWh lithium-ion battery. Production of the EV3 was cancelled in late 2018.

== See also ==
- List of motorized trikes
- Triking
- Morgan Super 3
