= Harley-Davidson Ironhead engine =

1980 HD XLR Sportster with Ironhead Engine
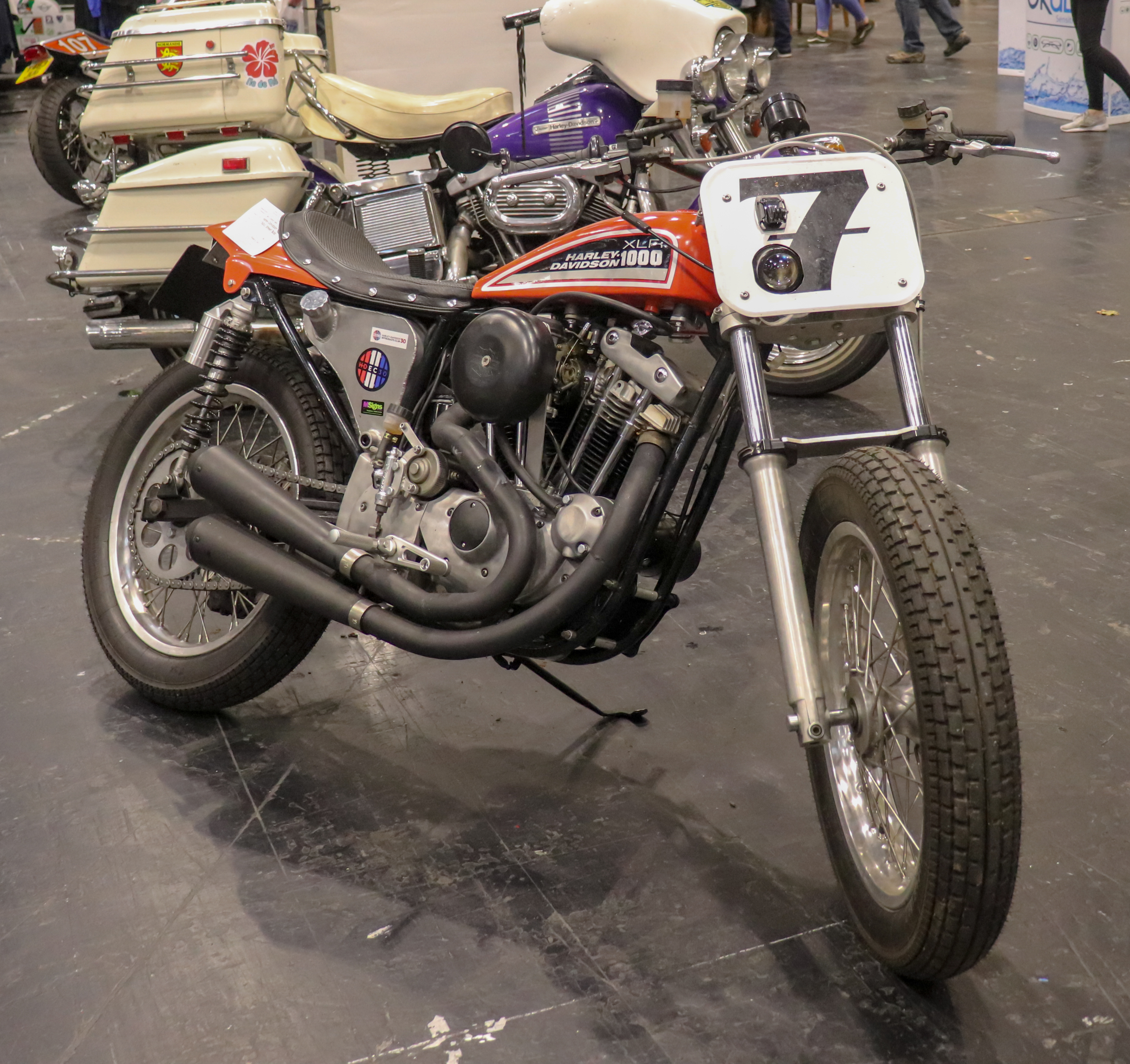
- Manufacturer: Harley-Davidson
- Also called: XL
- Production: 1957 to 1985
- Predecessor: Harley-Davidson KHK

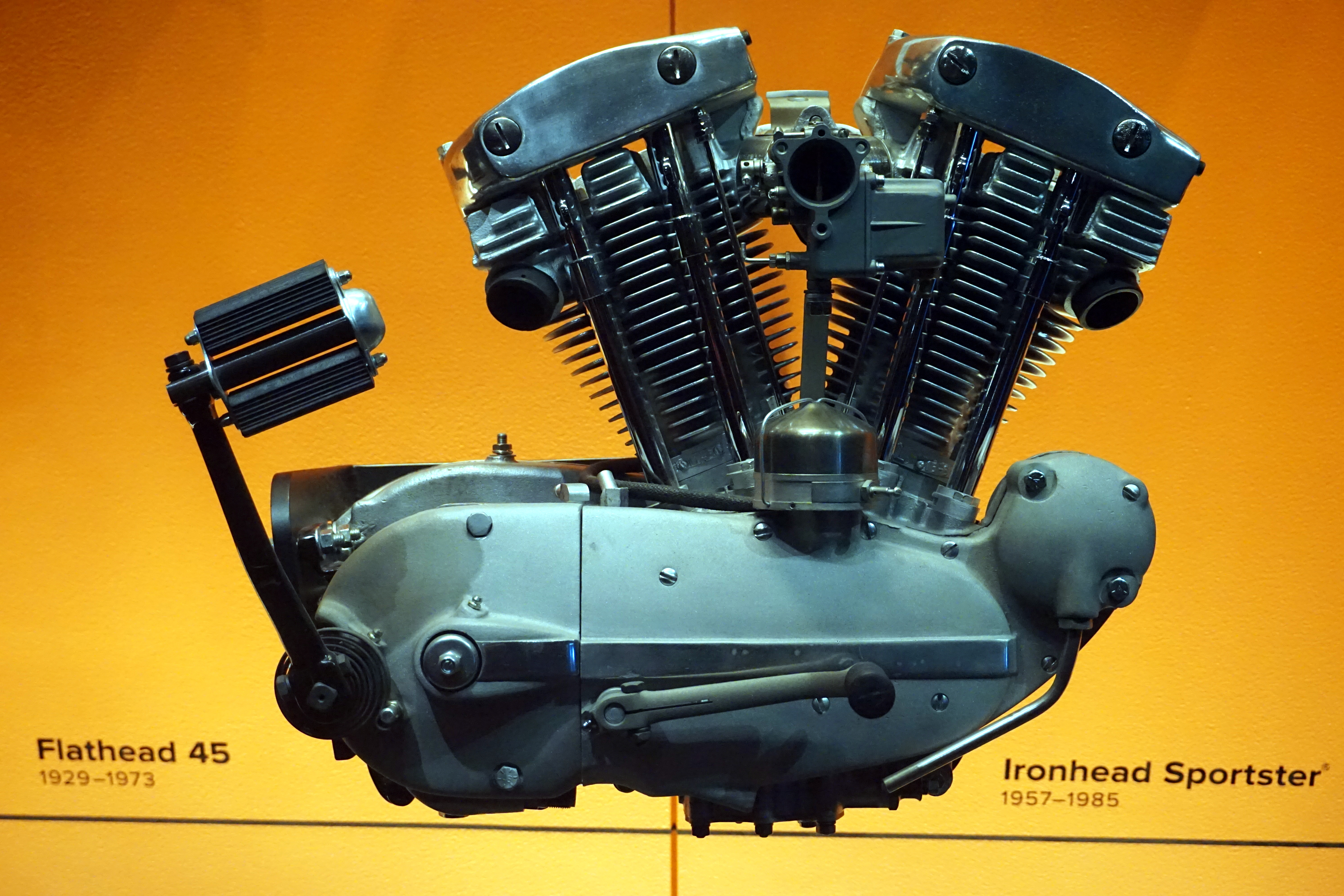
Harley-Davidson Ironhead Sportster engine at the Harley-Davidson Museum

The ironhead was a Harley-Davidson motorcycle engine, so named because of the composition of the cylinder heads (Iron instead of Aluminium). The engine is a two-cylinder, two valves per cylinder, pushrod V-twin. It was produced from 1957 until 1985 and was replaced by the Evolution engine in 1986.

This name was applied to the Harley-Davidson Sportster motorcycles that used this engine.

== See also ==
- Harley-Davidson engine timeline
