= Harley-Davidson Confederate Edition =

- Manufacturer: Harley-Davidson
- Production: 1977
- Predecessor: 1976 Bicentennial Liberty Edition
- Class: Cross model range of 631 units: * FLH Electra Glide * Super Glide * XLH Sportster * XLCH Sportster * XLT Sportster

The Harley-Davidson Confederate Edition was a cross-range limited edition motorcycle made by Harley-Davidson in 1977. It was released following the successful manufacture of the Liberty Edition to commemorate the United States Bicentennial in 1976. The Confederate Edition consisted of a special commemorative paint scheme of metallic gray paint and 'rebel' flag decals on the fuel tank and an army general's sleeve braid decal on the front fender and which was applied to the Harley-Davidson Super Glide, FLH Electra Glide, Harley-Davidson Sportster XLH, XLCH and XLT models.

The Confederate Editions sold in small numbers, Chris MacMahan of Motorcycle Classics thinks to be due to a combination of lack of significant promotion (it was overshadowed by the FXS Low Rider and XLCR Café Racer released the same year), boring paint work compared to emerging trends in brighter metallic paint and limited market.

The Confederate Edition is stored in the company's corporate archives in a connected building on the museum's grounds. Gene Perryman, a Harley-Davidson archivist, described the original model unit numbers that numbered the Confederate Editions (and which had been recently published in Old Bike Journal, Feb '95). The issue also described the rare promotional material for the Harley-Davidson Sportster Confederate Edition featuring a model in a cowboy hat with a Confederate flag.

Harley-Davidson Confederate Edition Sportster model (1977 promotional image showing flag/braid tank/fender decals)

Because of the low production numbers it may be the most collectible of all Harley-Davidson models.

== Confederate Edition unit production ==
Production of the Confederate Edition was as follows:

- FLH Electra Glide = 44
- FLHS =15
- FX Super Glide = 228
- XLH Sportster = 299
- XLCH Sportster = 45
- XLT Sportster = 15

== See also ==
- List of Harley-Davidson motorcycles
