= Morgan Super 3 =

Three-wheeled roadster

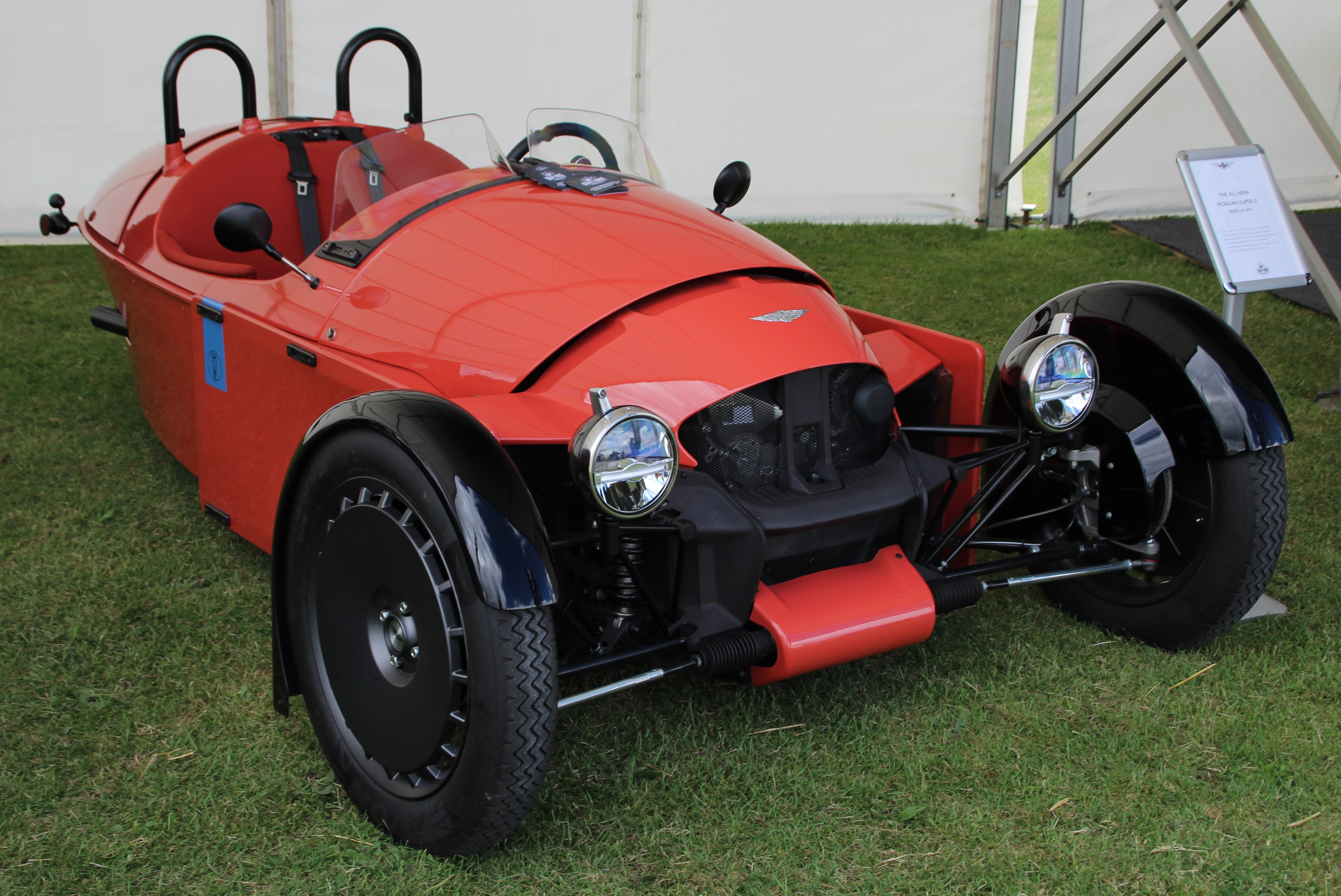

Overview
- Manufacturer: Morgan Motor Company
- Production: 2022–present
- Assembly: United Kingdom: Malvern, Worcestershire, England

Body and chassis
- Class: Sports car
- Body style: 2 seat, Roadster
- Layout: FR layout
- Platform: CX-Generation aluminium platform

Powertrain
- Engine: 1.5 L Ford Ti-VCT naturally aspirated I3 (GDI)
- Power output: 118 hp (87 kW)
- Transmission: 5-speed manual

Dimensions
- Length: 3,581 mm (141.0 in)
- Width: 1,850 mm (72.8 in)
- Height: 1,132 mm (44.6 in)
- Kerb weight: 635 kg (1,400 lb) dry

Chronology
- Predecessor: Morgan 3-Wheeler

The Morgan Super 3 is a three-wheeled roadster produced by the British car manufacturer Morgan.

== History ==
After production of the previous 3-Wheeler model was discontinued at the end of 2021, Morgan presented the Super 3 on 24 February 2022. It is available in Europe, the Middle East and the United States. The vehicle is built in Malvern, Worcestershire, England.

== Specifications ==
The Super 3 is based on the CX-Generation platform, which is also used by the Plus Four and Plus Six. Compared to the previous model, the chassis provides greater stability and offers additional space for occupants.

Only two small wind screens provide wind protection for the passengers. A soft top is not available. All interior assemblies are dustproof and protected against water to IP64 standards. The seats are not adjustable; The pedals and the steering column can be adjusted according to the driver's requirements. Fully digital instruments with a classic look are installed inside.

A naturally-aspirated three-cylinder petrol engine with a displacement of 1,496 cc (91.3 cu in) and an output of 87 kW (117 hp) powers the roadster, which weighs 635 kg (1,400 lb) when dry. The engine is installed longitudinally and hidden under a bonnet in front of the passenger compartment. The drive is transmitted through a Mazda-sourced, 5-speed manual transmission to the single rear wheel. The Super 3 takes seven seconds to reach 0 to 60 mph and the top speed is given as 130 mph (209 km/h).
