= Ironhead Studio =

American costume and art studio

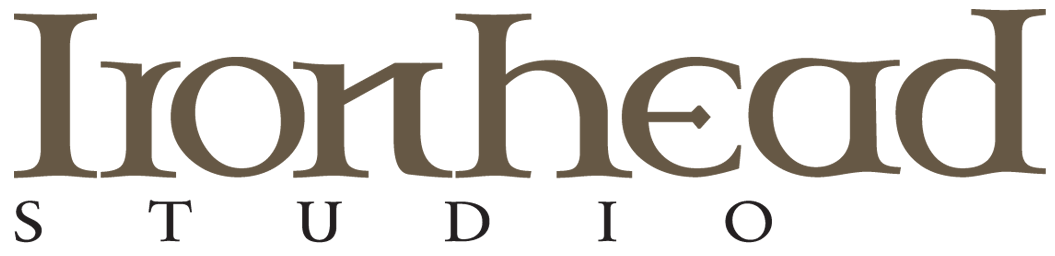
- Company type: Private
- Industry: Costume design
- Founded: December, 2007 in Los Angeles, United States
- Founder: Jose Fernandez
- Headquarters: Los Angeles, California, United States
- Website: ironheadstudio.com

Ironhead Studio is a costume and art studio based in Los Angeles, California founded by Jose Fernandez. The studio designs many different costumes for American films based on comics, including The Amazing Spider-Man, Thor, Batman v Superman: Dawn of Justice, as well as other Marvel Studios and DC Studios films.

One of the studio's specialties is creating wearable, three-dimensional, versions of objects specified by filmmakers.

From 2009 to 2018, Ironhead Studio designed the helmets used by Daft Punk.

In 2016, studio founder Jose Fernandez was asked by SpaceX to design their spacesuits, based on his work with the studio.

== Filmography ==
- After Earth (2013)
- Alice in Wonderland (2010)
- Alice in Wonderland: Through the Looking Glass (2016)
- Alien III (1992)
- Batman Returns (1992)
- Batman and Robin (1997)
- Batman Forever (1995)
- Batman v Superman: Dawn of Justice (2016)
- Battleship (2012)
- Bicentennial Man (1999)
- Captain America: The Winter Soldier (2014)
- Daft Punk
- Daredevil (2003)
- Dragonball: Evolution (2009)
- Fantastic Four (2005)
- Fantastic Four: Rise of the Silver Surfer (2007)
- G.I. Joe – Retaliation (2013)
- Goosebumps (2015)
- Iron Man 2 (2010)
- Jupiter Ascending (2015)
- Legion (2010)
- Oblivion (2013)
- Planet of the Apes (2001)
- Snow White and the Huntsman (2012)
- The Amazing Spider-Man (2012)
- The Amazing Spider-Man 2 (2014)
- The Avengers (2012)
- The Divergent Series: Insurgent (2015)
- The Green Hornet (2011)
- The Hunger Games: Mockingjay (2014)
- Thor (2011)
- Transformers: Dark of the Moon (2011)
- Tron: Legacy (2010)
- Watchmen (2009)
- X-Men: The Last Stand (2006)
- X-Men: First Class (2011)
- The Tick television series (2016)
- Dune (2021)
- Suicide Squad (2016)
- Man of Steel (2013)
- Black Panther: Wakanda Forever (2022)
- Spider-Man: Homecoming (2017)
- Free Guy (2021)
- Thor: Ragnarok (2017)
- Altered Carbon television series (2018-2020)
- Aquaman (2018)
- Passengers (2016)
- Avengers: Age of Ultron (2015)
- X-Men: Days of Future Past (2014)
- Captain America: Civil War (2016)
- X-Men: Dark Phoenix (2019)
- Dragonball Evolution (2009)
- Godzilla: King of the Monsters (2019)
- Ant-Man and the Wasp (2018)
- The Last Witch Hunter (2015)
- Thunder Force (2021)
- The First television series (2018)
