= Harley-Davidson Knucklehead engine =

Nickname that refers to a Harley-Davidson motorcycle engine

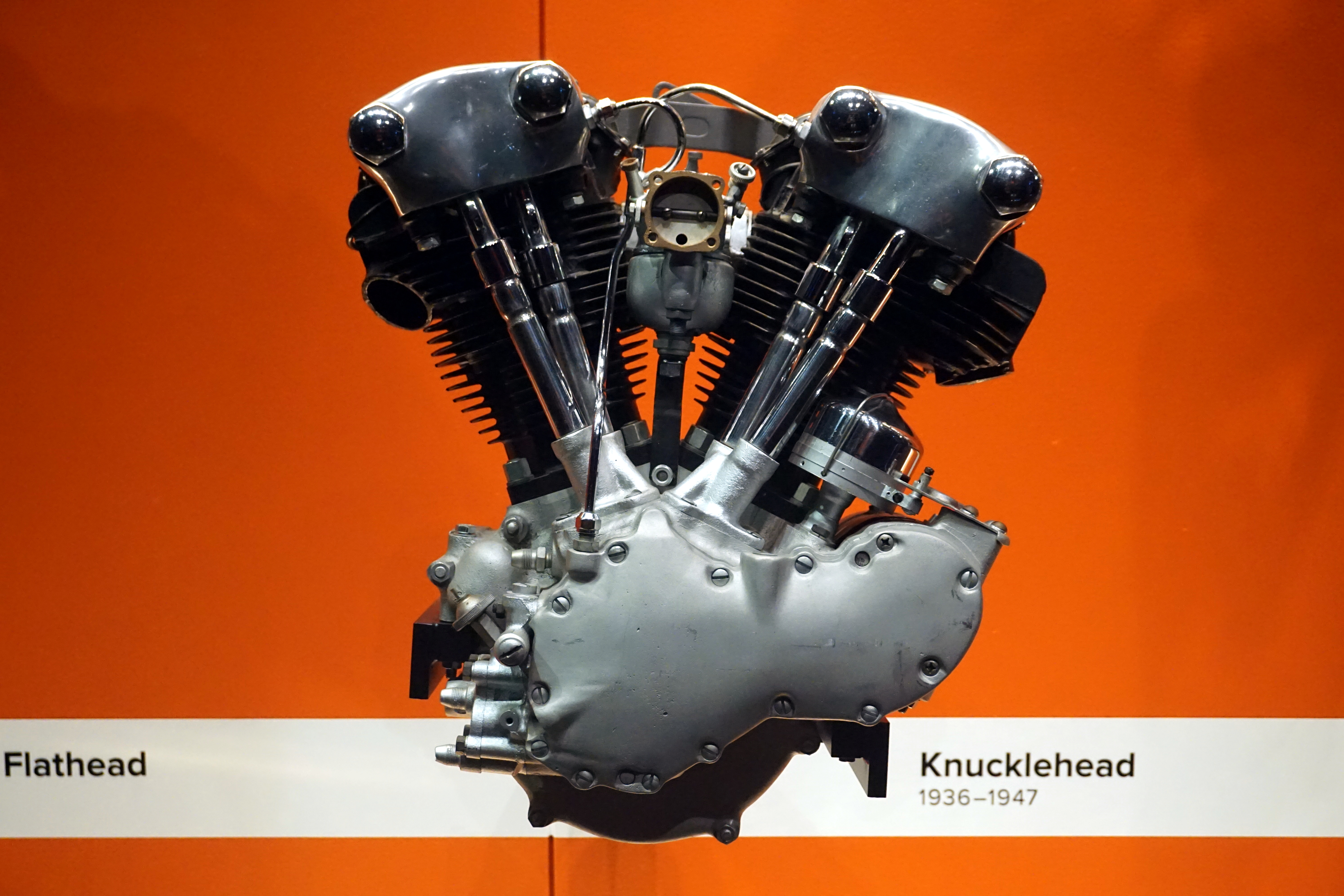
Harley-Davidson Knucklehead engine at the Harley-Davidson Museum, without oiltank and gearbox

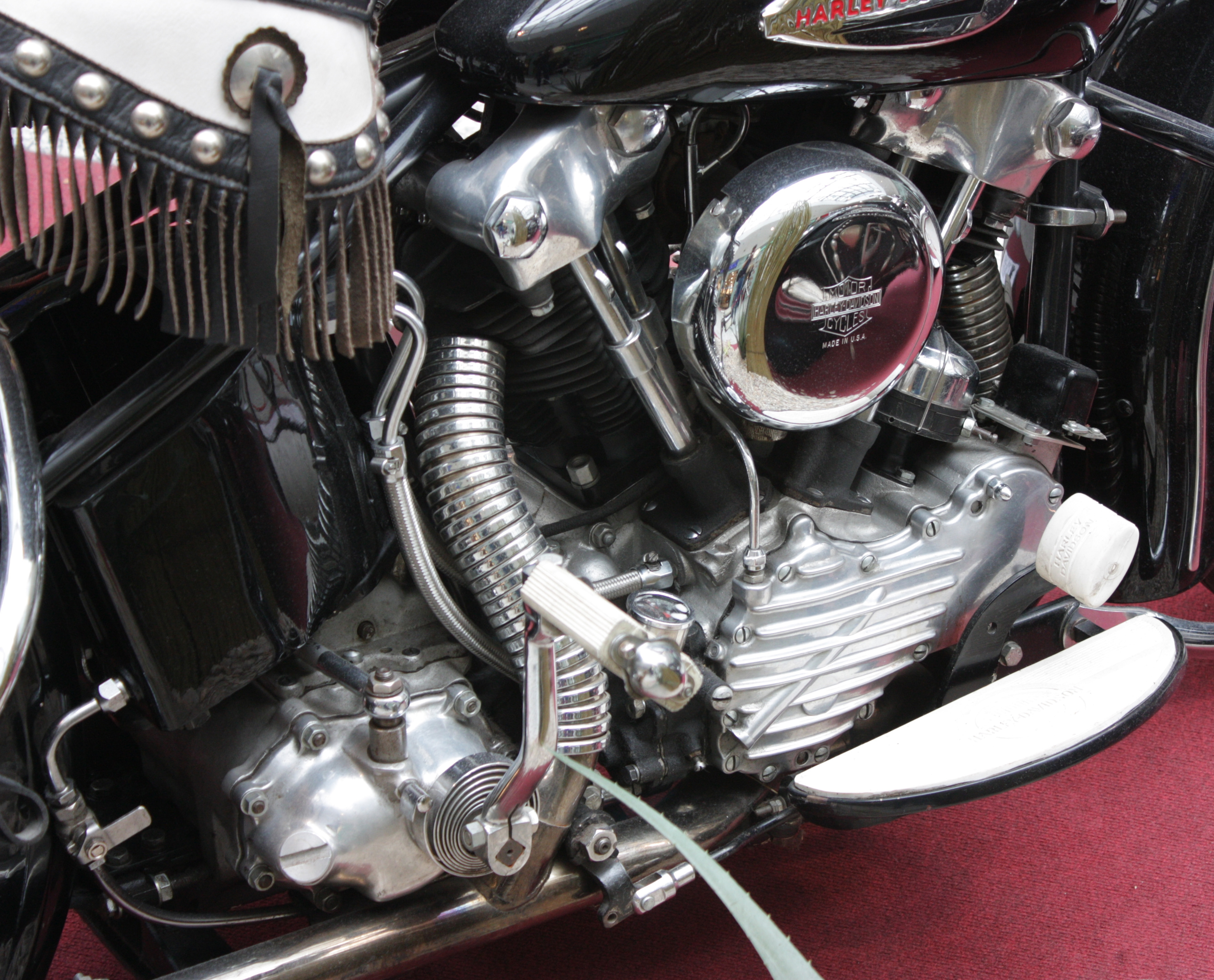
Harley-Davidson knucklehead motor

The knucklehead is a retronym used by enthusiasts to refer to the first Harley-Davidson motorcycle engine with overhead valves (OHV), introduced in 1936, and so named decades later because of the distinct shape of the rocker boxes and newer models showing different shapes. The Knucklehead engines and models were originally referred to as "OHVs" by enthusiasts of the time and in Harley's official literature.

The new type was introduced in 1936 with 61 cui (1000cc) as Model E, ES with sidecar, or EL for higher octane leaded gasoline and impressive 40 hp. In 1941, the larger capacity 74 cui (1200cc) versions were called F and FL (48 hp), with Harley-Davidson FL designating many Harley big twin models ever since. Since 1929, Harley had offered Flathead engines in two sizes, with the VL model being the top-of-the-line model, but still featuring Total-loss oiling system and the simple and reliable but inefficient side-valve engine with the combustion chamber next to the piston, over the standing valves which were directly actuated by camshafts. The principle is nowadays mainly used in lawnmowers and the like.

The new engine was still a two-cylinder, 45 degree, V-twin engine with two valves per cylinder, but these were now hanging over the piston, for a compact combustion chamber with many benefits. Despite these overhead valves being actuated by long pushrods, the concept allowed higher rpm anyway. The taller engine required a new frame, though, and instead of an wet sump with a large oil pan adding even more height, it had a dry sump lubrication system, with the separate horse-shoe-shaped oiltank above the gearbox, under the seat, hiding the battery.

The potential of the new design was demonstrated in 1937 on the sand beach of Daytona Beach, Florida, where Joe Petrali set a world motorcycle speed record of 136.183 mph with an experimental streamlined 61 cubic inch OHV Harley Model E. In the first years, Harley sold about 2000 of the new high performance models to enthusiasts each year, as police, mail service, military and other government agencies still preferred the well-established designs.

Harley answered by producing the hybrid models U, UL, ULH, basically the Model E with its new frame, dry sump lubrication and other improvements, but with side-valve flathead top ends instead of the complicated OHV cylinder heads that had teething issues with lubrication and overheating. In 1941, the OHV lineup was expanded by the 74 cui F and FL, but then the war effort required large numbers of simple flathead motorcycle, the 45 cui WLA for the US Army being the most numerous, followed by the WLC variants made for Canada which also ordered a few dozen ELC for sidecar use, a purpose also some UA were made for.

After the war, shortages still limited production, while imported more advanced European models with telescopic forks and rear suspension, as well as automobiles, challenged the remaining US motorcycle makers. The compromise flathead Model U outlived the Knuckle for some time and was still offered in 1948. The Knuckle had its best year in its last, 1947, when over 11000 of about 41000 in total were made. For 1948 the E/EL and F/FL were changed to the improved Harley-Davidson Panhead engine which took its unofficial name once again from the rocker box covers, with a new telescopic fork in 1949 being called Hydra-Glide, this time by the factory. In 1965 the Harley-Davidson Shovelhead engine appeared, with a third style of top end design, the bottom end still remaining the same for a few more years.

As the design of Harley-Davidson engines has evolved through the years, the distinctive shape of each model's valve covers has allowed Harley enthusiasts to classify an engine simply by looking for those shapes. The contours of a knucklehead engine's valve covers to some resemble knuckles on a person's fist. The nickname arose from the California chopper culture of the late 1960s.
