= Harley-Davidson Panhead engine =

Type of motorcycle engine

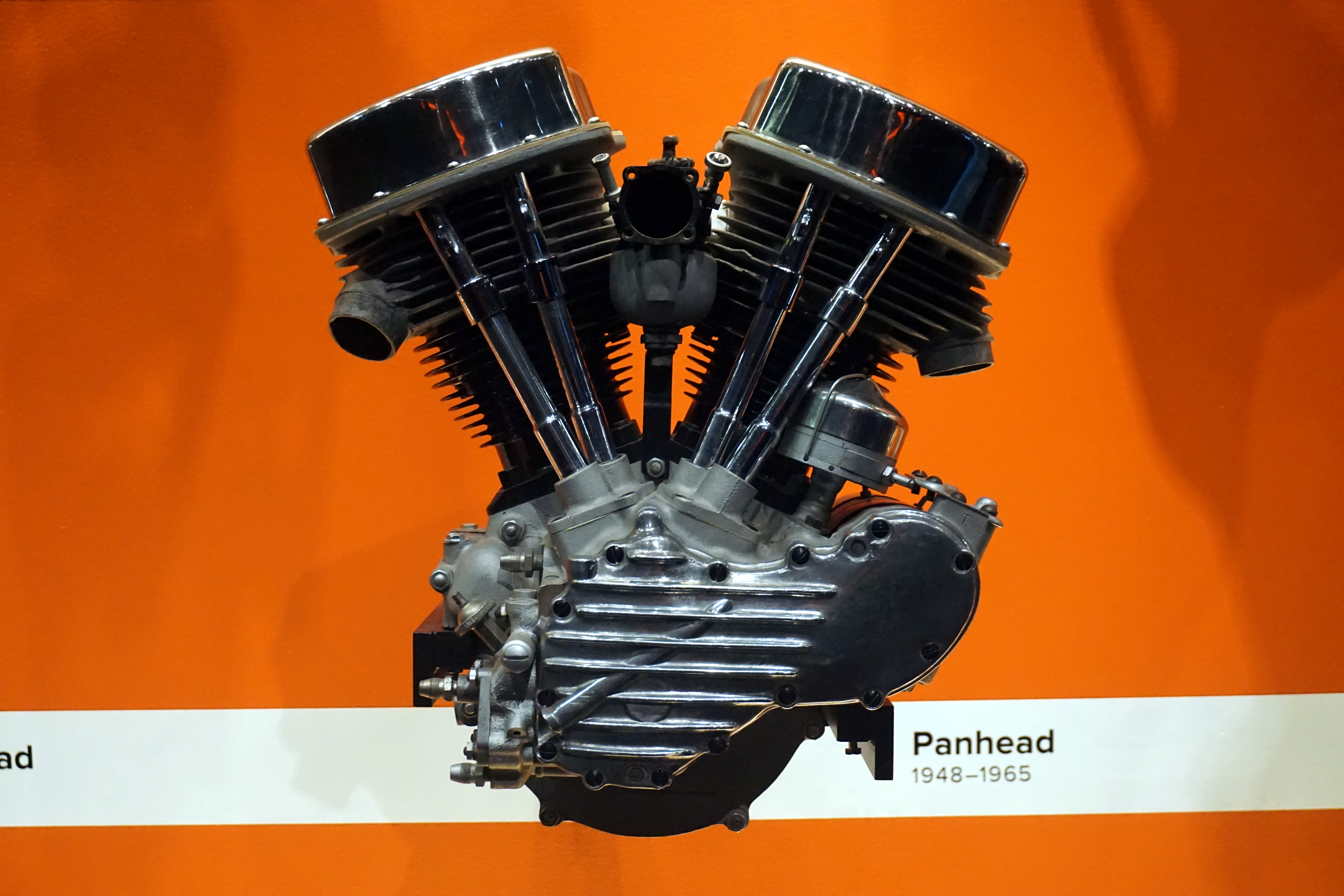
Harley-Davidson Panhead engine at the Harley-Davidson Museum

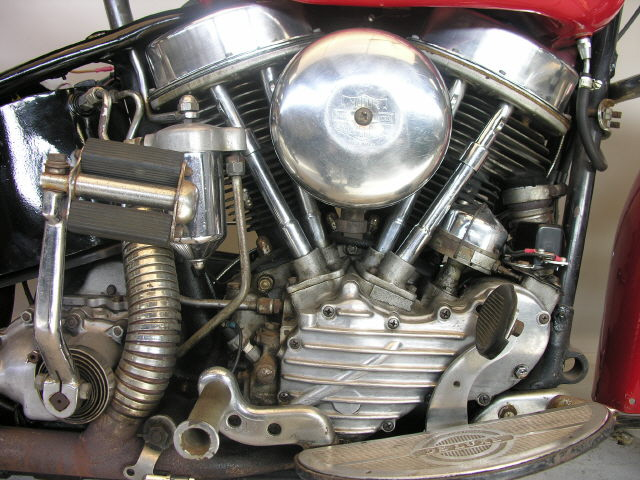
Harley-Davidson panhead motor

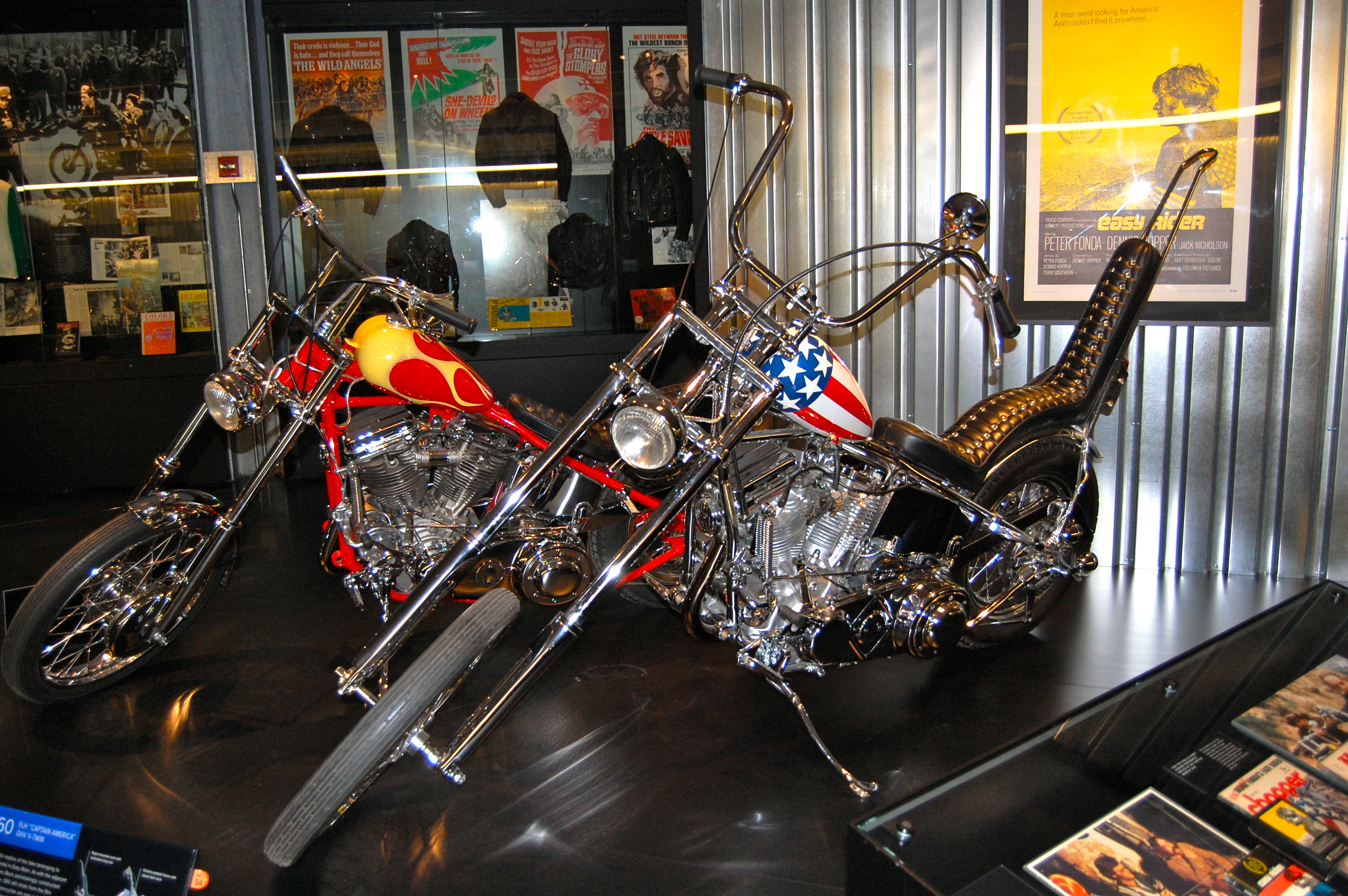
Replicas of the Captain America bike and Billy Bike at the Harley-Davidson Museum in Milwaukee

The Panhead is an overhead-valve Harley-Davidson motorcycle engine, so nicknamed because the rocker covers resembled cooking pans. The engine is a two-cylinder, two-valve-per-cylinder, pushrod V-twin, made in both 61 c.i. (EL) and 74 c.i. (FL, FLH) displacements. The Panhead engine replaced the Knucklehead engine in 1948 and was manufactured until 1965 when it was replaced by the Shovelhead.

As Harley-Davidson engines evolved, the distinctive shape of the rocker covers led Harley enthusiasts to recognise an engine simply by identifying the head, with names such as "Flathead", "Knucklehead", "Panhead", and "Shovelhead". In addition to factory models, Panhead engines became a popular choice for custom motorcycles during the rise of American chopper culture in the 1960s and 1970s, valued for their distinctive appearance and ease of modification.

As of 2024, a number of third-party engine manufacturers produce custom Panhead-style engines in a variety of bores, many much larger than the original-design displacements. Each manufacturer upgrades the original design to improve performance and reliability, while preserving the classic styling and overall engine structure.

The "Captain America" chopper used by Peter Fonda in the movie Easy Rider (1969) had a Panhead engine, as did the "Billy Bike" ridden by Dennis Hopper's character.
