= Harley-Davidson Shovelhead engine =

Motorcycle engine, produced 1966–1984

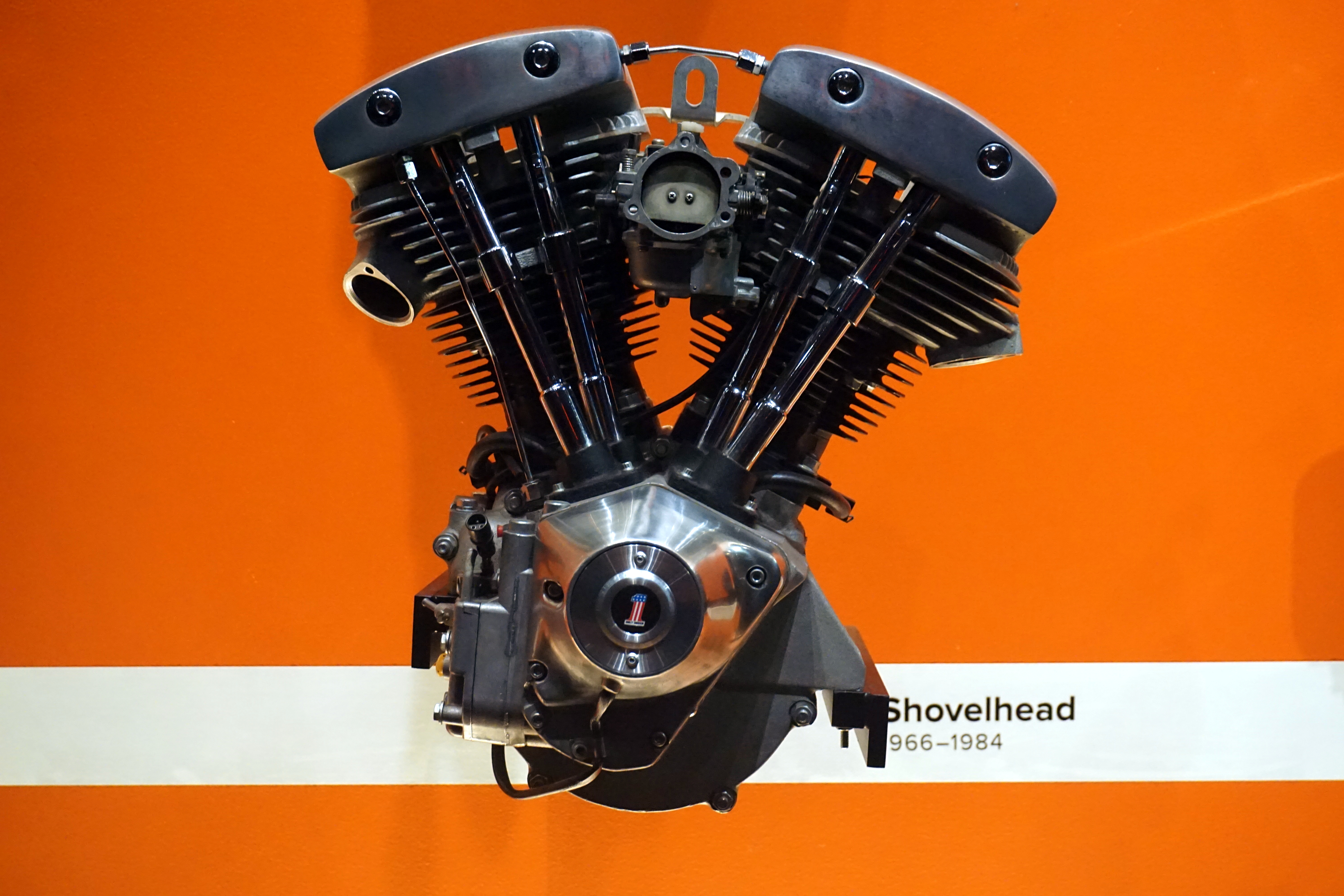
Harley-Davidson Shovelhead engine at the Harley-Davidson Museum

The Shovelhead engine is a motorcycle engine that was produced by Harley-Davidson from 1966 to 1984, built as a successor to the previous Panhead engine. When the engine was first produced, the Shovelhead had a shallower combustion chamber, larger valve drop for both intake and exhaust, better porting, and stronger valves and pistons. This gave the new engine an extra 10 horsepower, along with a different appearance. The engine gained the nickname “Shovelhead” because its rocker covers look a little bit like an upside-down coal shovel. While the engine did have problems, it gave Harley-Davidson a 26% sales increase during the early part of its timeline.

== History ==
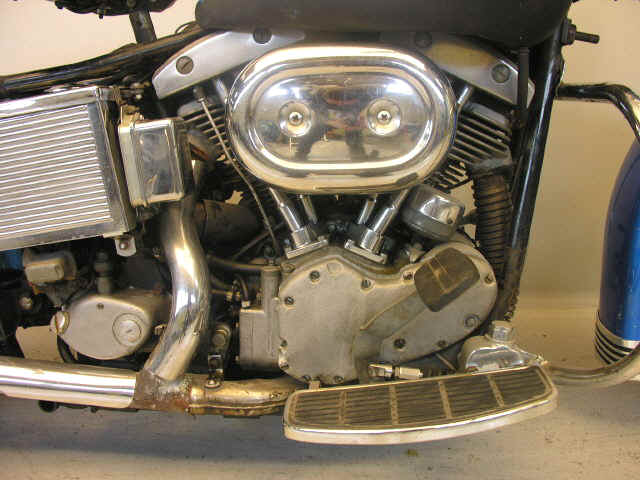
Early Harley-Davidson Shovelhead engine on a motorcycle frame

The Shovelhead engine was created as the previous Panhead engine was becoming obsolete, with many Harley-Davidson owners demanding more power to compete with the more modern motorcycles. Throughout the Shovelhead's run, the engine had many different changes made to it to improve power, cooling and oil consumption. The engines had only 10 fins for cooling, which caused them to run hot. Another problem was that oil would pool in the cylinder heads, causing it to leak into the valves and burn oil. Another problem was that oil would pool in the crankcase rather than being pumped, causing the engine to overheat and seriously harm performance. Oil leakage and consumption became such a problem with the bikes, many owners reported losing as much as a quart of oil every 500 miles. In fact, Harley Davidson owner's manuals and shop manuals of the day specified that normal oil consumption varied from 250 to 500 miles per quart. Much of this was due to the 1940s technology whereby the old stock Bohnalite pistons were fitted with single-piece oil scraper rings. Excessive heat in some motors also caused serious problems. With the adoption of unleaded fuels in the American market, the non-hardened valve seats of the vintage Shovelhead could wear excessively and require service. Some detractors of the Shovelhead would say things like the motors would often last only between 500 and 5,000 miles. On the other hand, simply replacing the one-piece oil scraper rings with slightly later 3-piece versions and changing out the valve seats with hardened seats would result in oil consumption and head longevity on par with the succeeding Evolution engines. With Harley-Davidson trying to fix the engine rather than research and develop, they fell far behind the competition of the cheaper and more reliable Japanese bikes taking control over the market.

As a way to try to combat their financial struggles, the company merged with the American Machine and Foundry (known as AMF) hoping to gain help from their struggles. After AMF took control, the merged company started to make attempts at improving the engine with their own funds. In 1970, the alternator was redesigned for less strain, hidden behind a new and redesigned side case. The carburetors were changed to Zenith-Bendix, improving flow and power that started to gain a better image for the engine. However, in 1974, the engine started to show many more problems. With the United States involved in the 1973 oil crisis, gasoline had a much lower octane and consistency that severely hurt the engine's performance. Engine knock became a large problem; causing overheating that led to blown gaskets and damaged head bolts. AMF tried to combat this by producing more units in 1976 despite the engine's problems, which ended up leading to a damaged employee reputation, along with seriously declined quality in their units. After realizing they would need some serious improvement to fix their current situation, they produced some updates in 1978 to the engine that consisted of a larger displacement, and steel struts cast into the pistons to prevent them from expanding from the heat. However, the changes were not enough for the declining quality of American fuel at the time. Valves and guides were prone to problems, along with more overheating, detonation, and oil consumption.

Another problem that arose in 1979 was that the motors were fitted with electronic ignition units, which were prone to failure. Many owners would swap the units for an older point-ignition system for reliability. The larger compression ratio on the newer engines was still a serious problem, due to the low fuel quality and octane. With many Shovelhead owners having to turn towards aftermarket parts to keep the bike running properly, Harley-Davidson realized they would have to start developing a new engine. Towards the end of the Shovelhead's production, Harley-Davidson made numerous modifications in an attempt to keep the engine usable for production. Belt drive was added to their motorcycles in 1980 to prevent the oil leakage from the enclosed chain, along with a 5-speed transmission and rubber motor mounts to help reduce vibration. In 1981, Harley Davidson purchased AMF's share of the company back, adding a new oil pump, improved valve guides, and lowering the compression to help the engines run on the lower quality gasoline in the United States. The engine was produced until 1984, where the Evolution engine, which had aluminum heads and barrels, began to take over on most models. The engine could still be found in certain models such as the FLH in 1985, but was shortly replaced by the succeeding Evolution engine.

== Usage ==
The Shovelhead engine was ultimately fitted to all of Harley-Davidson's big twin motorcycles throughout its production. The engines were first met with controversy due to the Shovelhead's weight and ground clearance. Because of this steering and weaving became a new issue that arose with motorcycles fitted with the engine. To bring more models into production, the FX Super Glide was released in 1971 with a "chopper" look that was ultimately an FLH with a Sportster front. This brought the motorcycle scene at the time to a broader audience and improved sales for the company. The FLH was also available with an Electra-glide package, which was used as a police engine for the motorcycles. It allowed the engines to turn over for a longer period while idling, along with having an electric start. Because of the added weight of the larger engine on motorcycles with the Electra-glide package, the bikes were faster and more powerful at the tradeoff of being much harder to maneuver. Due to the police package being a rarity, it is highly sought after by collectors. Today, the engines are commonly used by classic motorcycle enthusiasts for restoration projects due to the engine's simple transmission, high torque, and smooth powerband.

== See also ==
- Harley-Davidson engine timeline
- Harley-Davidson Motorcycle Company
- List of Harley-Davidson Motorcycles
