= List of Harley-Davidson motorcycles =

HD List

A list of motorcycles produced under the Harley-Davidson brand.

== Pre-war ==
Model	Engine	Years	Notes
Models 0, 1 (Named retroactively in 1908)	24.74 cu in (405.4 cc) IOE single	1904–1905	Single-downtube bicycle-like frame, direct leather belt drive, rear coaster brake. Construction began in 1903; sold as production models in 1904–1905
Models 2, 3 (Named retroactively in 1908)	26.8 cu in (439 cc) IOE single	1906–1907	Dual-spring front-end suspension
Model 4	26.8 cu in (439 cc) IOE single	1908	Larger front fork, tires, and fenders.
Models 5, 6	30.16 cu in (494.2 cc) IOE single	1909–1910	Models 5 and 5A had 28-inch (710 mm) wheels, the former with battery ignition and the latter with magneto ignition. 5B and 5C models offered the same choice of ignitions, with 26-inch (660 mm) wheels for shorter riders. Model 6 series added an idler arm.
Model 7D	49 cu in (800 cc) 45° IOE V-twin	1911	
Models X8D, X8E	60.32 cu in (988.5 cc) 45° IOE V-twin	1912	"X" model name designated rear-wheel clutch. "D" indicated belt drive; "E" introduced chain drive for the first time. The frame was redesigned to be lower-slung and had a spring suspension in the rear downtube.
Models 9A, 9B	34.47 cu in (564.9 cc) IOE single	1913	Model 9A was belt-drive-equipped; 9B, chain-drive. The updated single-cylinder motor used a mechanical intake valve, like that first introduced on the V-twin model.
Model 10F	49.48 cu in (810.8 cc) 45° IOE V-twin	1914	The two-speed transmission was introduced and showcased on this model, along with a step-starter, enclosed intake valve, a primary chain drive, and optional sidecar.
Model 11F	61 cu in (1,000 cc) 45° IOE V-twin	1915	Three-speed transmission and electric head- and taillights debuted on this model.

== Hummer/American Lightweight ==
Model	Engine	Years	Notes
Model 125	125 cc (7.6 cu in) two-stroke single	1948–1952	Copy of DKW RT 125 given to Harley-Davidson as war reparations. More than ten thousand were sold in the first year of production.
Model 165	165 cc (10.1 cu in) two-stroke single	1953–1959	Replacement for the Model 125, with larger engine.
Hummer	125 cc (7.6 cu in) two-stroke single	1955–1959	Redesigned "B" engine with the old 125 cc (7.6 cu in) capacity. Extremely basic specification: no battery, horn operated by rubber bulb, no turn signals, no brake light. Last 125 cc (7.6 cu in) American Lightweight.
Super 10	165 cc (10.1 cu in) two-stroke single	1960–1961	Replaced Model 165 and Hummer, used 165 cc (10.1 cu in) version of the "B" engine.
Topper	165 cc (10.1 cu in) two-stroke single	1960–1965	Scooter with fiberglass body, pull-start "B" engine, and continuously variable transmission, but no engine fan.
Ranger	165 cc (10.1 cu in) two-stroke single	1962	Off-road motorcycle without lights or front fender. Extremely low gearing.
Pacer	15 cu in (250 cc) two-stroke single	1962–1965	15 cu in (250 cc) replacement for the Super 10. A new frame with rear suspension was introduced in 1963.
Scat	15 cu in (250 cc) two-stroke single	1962–1965	Dual-purpose motorcycle based on the Pacer. The Ranger's low gearing was optional. Was switched to the sprung frame along with the Pacer in 1963.
Bobcat	15 cu in (250 cc) two-stroke single	1966	Last American Lightweight. Only American Lightweight made with a standard dual seat. One-piece ABS resin bodywork covered the tank and rear tyre and supported the seat.

== Aermacchis sold as Harley-Davidsons ==
Aermacchi motorcycles sold in US with Harley-Davidson badging.

Model Aermacchi Harley-Davidson motorcycle	Engine 275 cc	Years 1975	Notes single from
Sprint	15 cu in (250 cc) OHC single	1961–1968	Sold in "C" and "H" versions.
M-50, M-50 Sport	3.1 cu in (50 cc) two-stroke single	1965–1966 (M-50); 1966 (M-50 Sport)	Urban commuter bikes. M-50 was a single-seat step-through, M-50 Sport had a conventional gas tank and a dual seat.
M-65, M-65 Sport	4.0 cu in (65 cc) two-stroke single	1967–1972	Enlarged versions of M-50s.
X-90 Shortster	5.5 cu in (90 cc), two-stroke, single cylinder, air cooled	1973–1975	Bikes produced:8250 bikes in 1973, 7019 bikes in 1974 and 1568 bikes in 1975
Rapido	125 cc (7.6 cu in) two-stroke single	1968–1972	
TX 125	125 cc (7.6 cu in) two-stroke single	1973 only	Transition model (not a Rapido). 15HP @ 8,000rpm – Kick start – 5 speed – 254lb curb weight
Baja 100	100 cc (6.1 cu in) two-stroke single	1969–1972	Off-road
SS-350	21.0 cu in (344 cc) four-stroke OHC single	1971–1974	Sprint with larger engine. Up to 1972 kickstart, 4 speeds, 6 volts
SS-350	21.0 cu in (344 cc) four-stroke ohc single	1969–1974	kick or electric start, 4/5 speeds, 6/12 volts
SX-350	21 cu in (350 cc) two-stroke single	1975–1978	Two-stroke Trail bike .

== Touring ==
Model	Engine	Years	Notes
FL Hydra Glide	73 cu in (1,200 cc)	1949–1957	
FL Duo Glide	73 cu in (1,200 cc)	1958–1964	
FLH Electra Glide	73 cu in (1,200 cc) (1965–1980), 82 cu in (1,340 cc) (1978–1993)	1965–1993	Fitted with the Panhead engine in the first year of production with an electric start, the Shovelhead engine in the second year of production, and the Evolution engine after 18 years in production.
FLHS Electra Glide Sport	73 cu in (1,200 cc) (1997); 82 cu in (1,340 cc)	1987–1993	A stripped down Electra Glide without the "Batwing" fork-mounted fairing or Tour-Pak with a simple windshield. The Electra Glide Sport was a precursor to the Road King. It was relaunched in 1981 as the Sport Electra Glide and in 1983-84 had an Evolution engine and a new chassis. In 1987, it had the Tour Glide's all-in-one console for its instruments, and a different nacelle.
FLHR/I Road King	82 cu in (1,340 cc) (1998); 88 cu in (1,450 cc) (1999–2010); 88 cu in (1,450 cc) (2010–2016) (103–110 cu in (1,690–1,800 cc) on CVO only)	1994–2016	A stripped down FLH touring model with an updated Duo-Glide style headlamp nacelle that replaced Electra Glide Sport. 1994–1998 used the 82 cu in (1,340 cc) Evolution engine power plant and older frame dimension (seat height), with fuel injection being offered as an option from 1996. The 1999–2008 used the newer Twin Cam engine and had a lower seat height. The Road Kings also came in a 'Classic' version with wire spoked wheels (FLHRC-I), a factory custom version with different leather saddlebags and a small chrome windshield (FLHRS-I) and an even more customized Screamin' Eagle edition (FLHRSEI).
FLT Tour Glide	82 cu in (1,340 cc)	1980–1996	Introduced a new touring frame with rubber-mounted engine, five speed transmission, steering geometry with a low rake angle and the fork mounted behind the headset. The Tour Glide had a frame-mounted fairing.
FLTR/I Road Glide	82 cu in (1,340 cc) (1998); 88 cu in (1,450 cc) (1999–2010); 88 cu in (1,450 cc) (2010–2016) (103–110 cu in (1,690–1,800 cc) on CVO only)	1998–2016	Introduced an updated frame mounted Tour Glide fairing. 1998 was the only year the Road Glide was offered with the 1340 carbureted power plant. Ultra Electra Glide electrical system was standard, allowing plug and play additions and communications. Electrical system from the Electra Glide Classic was used beginning in 2000, with expensive upgrades available, communications upgrades requiring the radio be returned to the factory. The Road Glide has become the preferred touring model for customizing but started off with slow sales and was never available in every country that offered the Electra Glide series.
FLHT Electra Glide/FLHTC/U/I Electra Glide Ultra	82 cu in (1,340 cc) (1998); 88 cu in (1,450 cc) (1999–2010); 88 cu in (1,450 cc) (2010–2016) (103–110 cu in (1,690–1,800 cc) on CVO only)	1983–2016	An updated version of the Electra Glide with the Tour Glide frame and a "Batwing" fork-mounted fairing. Sold as "Standard" (FLHT), "Classic" (FLHTC) and "Ultra" (FLHTCU) models, the latter coming with addition crash bars, fairing lowers, black powder-coated engines and chrome work described as a "full dresser". From 1996, fuel injection became an option, denoted -I, before being adopted as standard equipment.
FLHX Street Glide / FLHXS Street Glide Special	88 cu in (1,450 cc) (2006–2006); 96.7 cu in (1,584 cc) (2007–2012); 103 cu in (1,690 cc) (2012–2016) on the Street Glide Special (2014–2016) (103–110 cu in (1,690–1,800 cc) on CVO only)	2006–present	A stripped-down version of the Electra Glide, the Street Glide is mechanically identical to the Electra Glide series machines but comes with a chopped down windscreen, no front fender trim, no Tour Pack, and a lower rear air-adjustable suspension. The Street Glide still retains all of the creature comforts of the Electra Glide bikes such as a Harman/Kardon sound system, cruise control, and optional ABS and security. A "Street Glide Special" version, designated FLHXS, was introduced in 2014 with the security system and ABS made standard, a Boom! Box 4.3" (FLHX) or 6.5GT (FLHXS) [with Touch screen and GPS] infotainment system, manually adjustable upgraded rear suspension, trim (including gloss black inner fairing and pin striping), and paint (some different colors between the FLHX and FLHXS). 2014-15 models of the FLHX and FLHXS incorporated the changes brought forward by Harley-Davidson's Project Rushmore

== Small twins (Model W / 45 / K-series / Sportster) ==
Model	Engine	Years	Notes
Model W	33.4 cu in (548 cc) flathead flat-twin	1919–1923	First of two H-D flat-twin motorcycle designs put into production, first H-D flathead motorcycle. The fork was a trailing link design.
D-series (45 solo)	45.1 cu in (739 cc) flathead	1929–1932	First H-D 45 cubic inch motorcycle, first H-D flathead V-twin motorcycle.
R-series (45 solo: R, RL, RLD,)	45.1 cu in (739 cc) flathead	1932–1936	Second series of 45 solo
W-series (45 solo: W, WL, WLA, WLC, WLD, WR)	45.1 cu in (739 cc) flathead	1937–1952	Recirculating oil system introduced on all H-D engines in 1936, R became W to denote this. WLA and WLC were military models, WR was a racing model
Servi-Car	45.1 cu in (739 cc) flathead	1932–1936 (R-series engine) 1937–1973 (W-series engine)	From 1964, the first Harley-Davidson to have electric starting.
Model K and KK	46 cu in (750 cc) flathead	1952–1953	Last 45 street solo, all-new engine, first civilian H-D with rear suspension
Model KR	46 cu in (750 cc) flathead	1953–1969	Racing only
Model KH and KHK	54.2 cu in (888 cc) flathead	1954–1956	KH-series: K series, same bore but longer stroke.
XL, Ironhead	53.9 cu in (883 cc), 61 cu in (1,000 cc) (1972–1985)	1957–1985	The first year of Sportster, a development of the KH with overhead-valve engines and cast iron heads. The engine was updated after 29 years.
XR-750	46 cu in (750 cc)	1970–1985	Overhead-valve engines, iron heads (1970–1971), alloy heads (1972–1985)
XLCR	61 cu in (1,000 cc)	1977–1978	OHV engines, iron heads, solo seats, snake exhaust, also includes reverse shifting pedal, and rear pegs.
XR1000	61 cu in (1,000 cc)	1983–1984	Street model using XR racing cylinder head and other XR engine parts.
XL, Evolution, "EVO"	53.9 cu in (883 cc), 1,100 cc (6.1 cu in) (1986–1987), 73 cu in (1,200 cc) (1988–)	1986–2022	The first year of the new Sportster to have the Evolution overhead-valve engine, alloy heads
XL883N, Iron	53.9 cu in (883 cc)	2009–2022	A "baby" version of the popular 73 cu in (1,200 cc) Nightster, it comes with more black and cast wheels.
XR1200(X),	73 cu in (1,200 cc)	2008–2010, 2011–2012 for X series	Redesigned frame, male-slider forks, improved brakes, and performance engine, along with orange paint evokes XR750 race bike; the XR1200X replaced the XR1200 – it included fully adjustable suspension both front and rear

== FX/FXR/FXD/FLD/Dyna ==
Model	Engine	Years	Notes
Super Glide FX FXE FXD FXD35	96.7 cu in (1,584 cc) (2007–2012)	1971–2012	First custom designed by Willie G. Davidson for the Super Glide series. FXD35 combined a fuel injected TC88 with 6 speed transmission in a numbered limited edition run of 3,500 to celebrate the 35th anniversary of the 1971 Super Glide design.
Low Rider FXS FXR FXDL	96.7 cu in (1,584 cc) (2007–2009), | 103 cu in (1,690 cc) (2014.5–)	1977–2009, 2014.5–2016	Second custom designed for the Dyna Glide family series. 2014 mid-year return of the Lowrider after 3 model years hiatus.
Fat Bob FXEF FXDF	96.7 cu in (1,584 cc) (2008–)	1979–1986, 2008–2016	2012 sees the introduction of new 103ci engine
Wide Glide FXWG FXDWG FXDWGI	96.7 cu in (1,584 cc) (2007–2011) | 103 cu in (1,690 cc) (2012–2017)	1980–1986, 1993–2016	Extended 41 mm forks, a 21" front wheel, and forward foot controls.
Sturgis FXB	82 cu in (1,340 cc)	1980–1982, 1991	First production Harley-Davidson with a belt final drive and a belt primary drive.
Super Glide II FXR	82 cu in (1,340 cc)	1982–1985	
Sport Glide FXRT	82 cu in (1,340 cc)	1983–1993	
Super glide II FXRS	82 cu in (1,340 cc)	1982–1988	
Low Glide	82 cu in (1,340 cc)	1984–1985	
Street Bob FXDB	96.7 cu in (1,584 cc) (2007–2013), | 103 cu in (1,690 cc) (2013–)	2006–2016	First "Dark Custom" designed for the Dyna Glide family series.
Switchback FLD	103 cu in (1,690 cc)	2012–2016	Quick attach/detach saddlebags and windshield (for touring or cruising)

== Softail ==
Model	Engine	Years	Notes
FLSB Sport Glide	107 cu in (1746cc)	2018-	
FLSTC Heritage Softail Classic	81.8–85.4 cu in (1,340–1,399 cc) OHV Evolution	1986–1999	Second entry in the Softail family.
FLSTSC Softail Heritage Springer Classic	88.4 cu in (1449cc) 96cu in (1584cc)	2005-2006 2007	
FLSTF/FLFB Fat Boy	81.5 cu in (1337cc) 88.4 cu in (1449cc) 96 cu in (1584cc) 103.1 cu in (1690cc)	1990–1998 1999-2006 2007-2011 2012-2017	
FLSTFB Fat Boy Lo	96 cu in (1584cc) 103.1 cu in (1690cc)	2010–2011 2012-2016	
FLFBS Fat Boy S	109.9 cu in (1801cc)	2016-2017	
FLFB Fat Boy	107 cu in (1746cc) 114 cu in (1868cc) 117 cu in (1920 cc)	2018 2018-2024 2025-	
FLHC Heritage Classic	107 cu in (1746cc) 114 cu in (1868cc)	2018-2021 2020-	
FLS Softail Slim	103 cu in (1,690 cc)107 cu in (1746cc)	2012–2017 2018-	
FLS Softail Slim S	109.9 cu in (1801cc)	2016-2017	
FLSTN Heritage Softail Nostalgia	81.5 cu (1337cc)	1993	aka "Moo Glide" (Production Limited to 2,700 units)
FLSTN Softail Deluxe	88.4 cu in (1449cc) 96 cu in (1584cc)103 cu in (1,690 cc)107 cu in (1746cc)	2005-2006 2007-2011 2012-2017 2018-2020	
FLSTS Softail Heritage Springer 95th Anniversary	88.4cu in (1449cc)	1998	
FLSTSB Cross Bones	96 cu in (1584cc)	2008–2011	
Hydra Glide Revival	114 cu in (1868cc)	2024	
FXBB Street Bob	107 cu in (1746cc) 114 cu in (1870cc)	2018-2020 2021	
FXCW Rocker	96 cu in (1584cc)	2008–2009	
FXCWC Rocker C	96 cu in (1584cc	2008-2010	chromed out version of Rocker
FXDR	114 cu in (1,870 cc)	2019–2021	
FXDRS	114 cu in (1,870 cc)	2019–2020	
FXSB Breakout	103 cu in (1,690 cc)107 cu in (1746cc)	2013–2017 2018	
FXBRS Breakout	114 cu in (1,870 cc)	2018–2020	
FXBR Breakout	117 cu in (1920cc)	2024-Present	
FXFBS Fat Bob	107 cu in (1746cc) 114 cu in (1870cc)	2018-2019 2020-Present	
FXLR Low Rider	81.5cu in (1337cc)	1987-1991	
FXLRS Low Rider "S"	107 cu in (1746cc) 114 cu in (1,870 CC) 117 cu in (1,920 CC) 117 cu in (H.O.) 2025-2026 models	2018-2019 2020-2021 2022-	
FXLRST Low Rider ST	117 cu in (1920 cc)	2022-Present	
FXST Softail		1984–?	First model in the Softail series.
FXST Softail Standard	88.4 cu in (1449cc) 96 cu in (1584cc) 107 cu in	1999-2006 2007 2020-	
FXSTS Springer Softail	81.5 cu in (1337cc) 88.4 cu in (1449cc)	1993 1999-2006	
FXSTSSE Springer Softail Screamin Eagle	110.1 cu in (1804cc)	2007-2009	
FXSTB Night Train	81.5 cu in (1337cc) 88.4 cu in (1449cc) 96 cu in (1584cc)	1997-1998 1999-2006 2007-2009	
FXSTC Softail Custom	81.5 cu in (1337 cc) 96 cu in (1584cc)	1986 2007-2010	
FXSTD Softail Deuce	88.4 cu in (1449cc) 96 cu in (1584cc)	1999–2006 2007	
FXSTSB Bad Boy	81.5 cu in (1337 cc)	1995-1996	
FXS Blackline	96cu in (1584 cc)	2011–2013	

== Military ==
Model	Engine	Years	Notes
WLA	45 cu in (740 cc)	1939–1945, 1949–1952	WLA was the U.S. Army version of civilian WL; WLC was the Canadian Army version
XA	45 cu in (740 cc) flat-twin	1942–1943	Tactical motorcycle for desert warfare. Based heavily on and retro-engineered from BMW R71 design. Flat-twin engine with a longitudinal crankshaft, a gearshift pedal, shaft drive, and plunger rear suspension. Approximately 1000 produced for testing. Not used in combat nor ordered in volume.
MT350E	Rotax 21.2 cu in (348 cc) OHC single	1993–2000	A development of the Armstrong MT500 dual-purpose military motorcycle.

== Trikes ==
Model	Engine	Years	Notes
Harley-Davidson FLHXXX Street Glide Trike	103	2010, 2011	
Harley-Davidson Servi-Car		1932–1973	
Harley-Davidson Tri Glide Ultra Classic	103 cu in (1,690 cc) OHV V-twin	2009–	
Harley-Davidson Freewheeler	104–107 cu in (1,700–1,750 cc) Milwaukee 8	2015–	
Harley-Davidson Road Glide 3	114 cu in, VVT 117 cu in. (2026)	2023-	
Harley-Davidson Street Glide 3 Limited	VVT 117 cu in.	2026-	

== Adventure Touring ==
Model	Engine	Years	Notes
Harley-Davidson Pan America	76.4cu in (1250 cc)	2020–	

== Street ==
Model	Engine	Years	Notes
Street 500	30 cu in (494cc)	2014-2021	
Street 750	46 cu in (749cc)	2014-2020	
Street Rod 750	46 cu in (749cc)	2017-2020	High Output Revolution X engine

== See also ==
- V-Rod Models
