= Harley-Davidson X440 =

- Manufacturer: Harley Davidson; Hero MotoCorp
- Production: 2023-present
- Class: Cruiser bike
- Engine: 440 cc (27 cu in) FI, air-cooled (with oil cooler), four-stroke cycle, single
- Bore / stroke: 79.6 mm × 88.4 mm (3.13 in × 3.48 in)
- Torque: 38 Nm
- Ignition type: Electric start
- Transmission: 6-speed manual
- Suspension: Front: KYB Upside-down Forks, 43 mm travel Rear: Twin shocks
- Brakes: Front: 320 mm (disc); Rear: 240 mm disc brake
- Tires: Front:100/90-18; Rear:140/70-17
- Wheelbase: 1,418 mm (55.8 in)
- Dimensions: L: 2,168 mm (85.4 in); W: 760 mm (30 in); H: 1,136 mm (44.7 in)
- Fuel capacity: 13.5 L (3.0 imp gal; 3.6 US gal)
- Related: Hero Mavrick 440

The Harley-Davidson X440 is a motorcycle manufactured by Harley-Davidson in collaboration with Hero MotoCorp in India. It was launched on 3 July 2023. The X440 is the Harley Davidson's most affordable motorcycle in India.

== Variants ==
The X440 comes with three variants:

- Denim (Base Trim) - Comes with only one color, Offers spoke wheels and Lacks Bluetooth smartphone Connectivity and TFT Cluster Display.
- Vivid (Mid Trim) - Comes with two colors (Red and Silver), and Offers Alloy Wheels, Tubeless Tyres etc. Just like Denim, it lacks Bluetooth smartphone Connectivity and TFT Display.
- S (Top Trim) - Comes with diamond cut alloy wheels and offers TFT Cluster Display, Bluetooth smartphone Connectivity with Voice Recognition, GPS Navigation, Phone Calls etc.

== See also ==
- List of Harley-Davidson motorcycles
- Harley-Davidson
- Hero Motocorp
