= Harley-Davidson Tri Glide Ultra Classic =

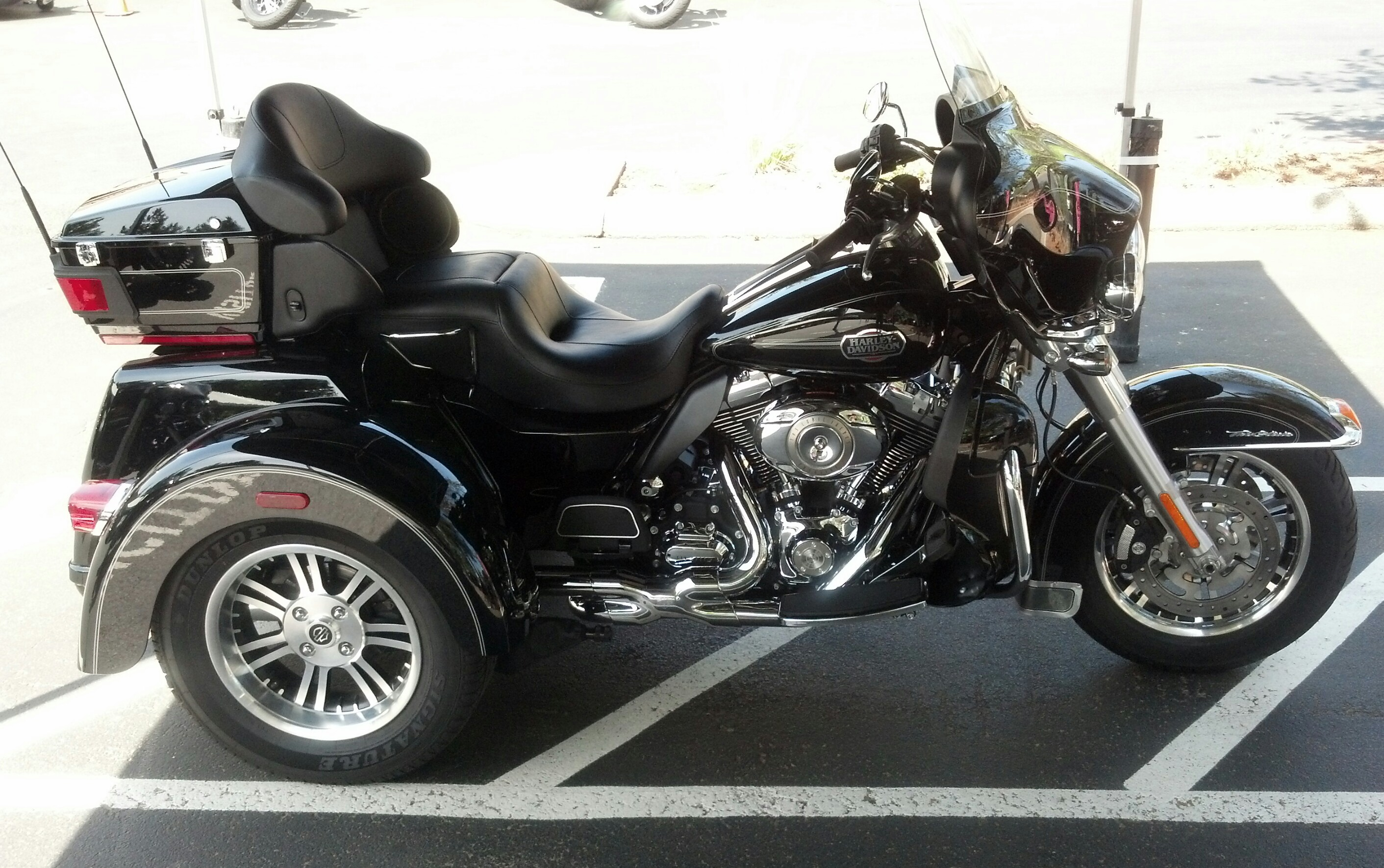
- Harley-Davidson Tri Glide Ultra Classic
- Manufacturer: Harley-Davidson
- Predecessor: Harley-Davidson Servi-Car
- Class: Three-wheeled cruiser
- Engine: air-cooled wOHV V-twin engineuntil 2014 then they added watercooler heads
- Transmission: 6 speed manual, optional electric reverse
- Tires: Front: MT90B16 72H; Rear: 2 x P205/65R15
- Rake, trail: 32°, 3.94 in (100.1 mm)
- Wheelbase: 66.6 in (1,692 mm)
- Dimensions: L: 105.8 in (2,687 mm); W: 55 in (1,397 mm)
- Seat height: 27.5 in (698 mm)
- Fuel capacity: 6.0 US gal (23 L)
- Related: Harley-Davidson FL, Harley-Davidson Freewheeler

The Harley-Davidson Tri Glide Ultra Classic is a three-wheeled motorcycle manufactured by Harley-Davidson and introduced in the 2009 model year. Its model designation is FLHTCUTG.

== History ==
The Tri Glide Ultra Classic is the first three-wheeled motorcycle produced by Harley-Davidson since the Harley-Davidson Servi-Car, which was manufactured from 1932 to 1973.

The Tri Glide is based on the Harley-Davidson Electra Glide Ultra Classic, a conventional two-wheeled touring motorcycle. Harley-Davidson entered into an agreement in 2008 with Lehman Trikes of Spearfish, South Dakota to provide parts and "conversion services", and final assembly of the Tri Glides was initially completed at Lehman's facility. Company owner John Lehman died in January, 2012, and the Tri Glides are now assembled at the Harley-Davidson plant in York, Pennsylvania. Shortly after the product introduction, a Tri Glide led the way in the parade at the Inauguration of Barack Obama on January 20, 2009.

Harley-Davidson briefly offered a second trike model called the Street Glide Trike with fewer standard features, starting in the 2010 model year. The Street Glide Trike is no longer manufactured.

Harley released a new trike model in 2015, the Harley-Davidson Freewheeler.

== Target market ==
At first because of its inherent stability, the Tri Glide, like other three-wheeled motorcycles, was marketed to motorcycle riders who were experiencing health problems due to aging or injuries, and to female riders.

== Features ==
The Tri Glide is powered by a 114 cu in (1,870 cc) overhead valve V-twin engine that produces a claimed 120 ft lbs of torque and 93 rear wheel horsepower, and is equipped with a six speed transmission. The engine has electronic fuel injection. Electric powered reverse was available as an option when the Tri Glide was introduced, but later became a standard feature. Electronic cruise control is standard.

== See also ==
- List of Harley-Davidson motorcycles
- List of motorized trikes
