= Clews Competition Motorcycles =

British motorcycle manufacturer

CCM Motorcycles Ltd
- CCM Logo
- Type: Private
- Industry: Motorcycle
- Founded: 1971
- Founder: Alan Clews
- Headquarters: Bolton, United Kingdom
- Key people: Alan Clews, Austin Clews
- Products: Motorcycles
- Website: www.ccm-motorcycles.com

Alternate Logo

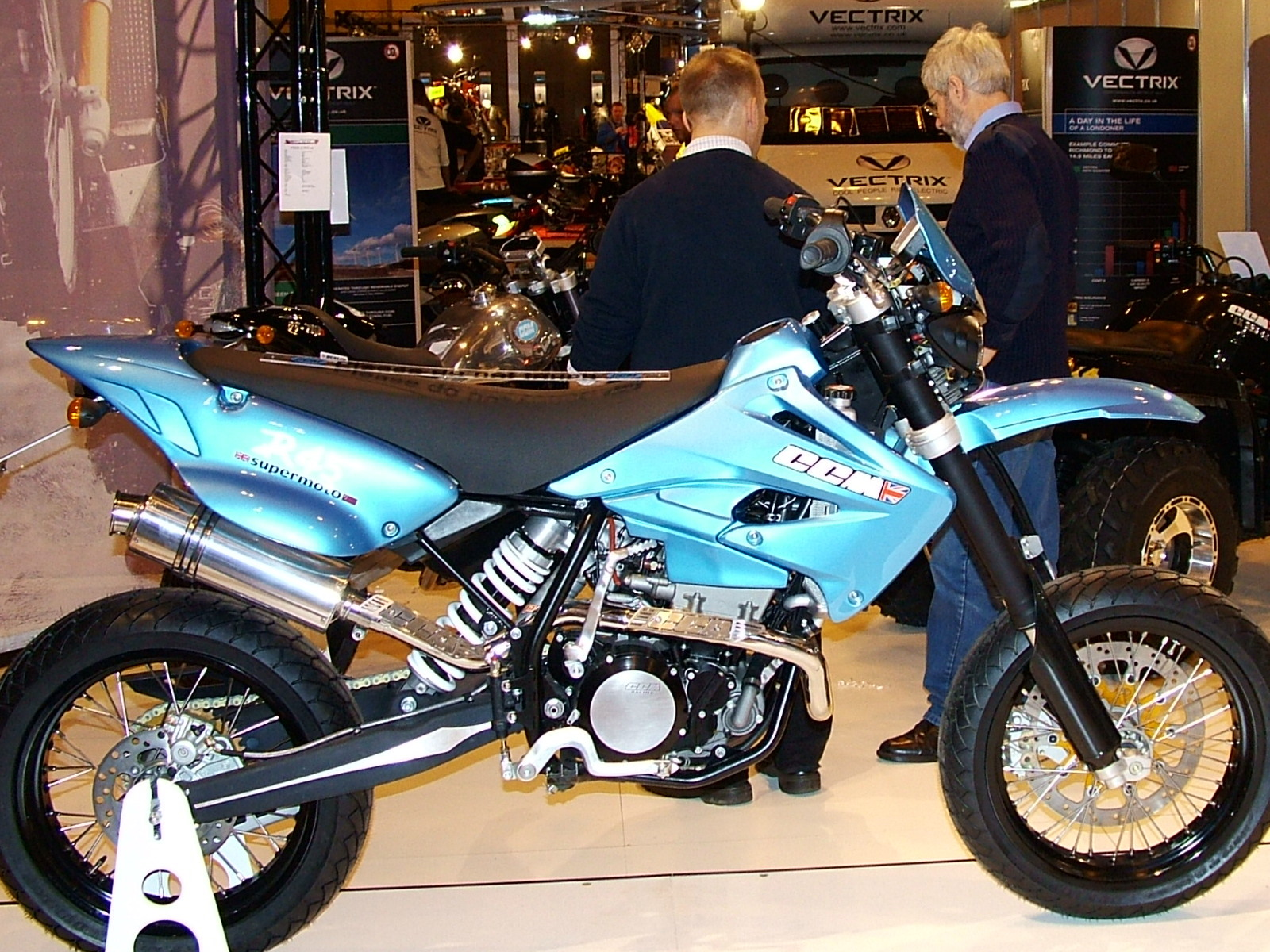
CCM R45 (2007 NEC Show)

Clews Competition Machines (CCM) is a British motorcycle manufacturer based in Bolton, England. CCM was founded in 1971 by Alan Clews and gained notability for producing specialised BSA powered motocross machines. The company has produced a variety of motorcycle models over its history using a variety of engine suppliers including Rotax, Suzuki and Kymco.

== History ==
Alan Clews was a successful Trials and Scrambles competitor in the late 1960s. He wanted a lighter, more nimble and modern motocross bike, like the custom-built 500 cc motorcycles used by the BSA factory racing team. When the BSA Competition Department was disbanded in 1971, he saw his opportunity and bought all the factory parts that were available.

Clews started building motocross bikes in his garage. Having no access to BSA works engines, Clews made his own extensive improvements to the standard BSA B50 500 cc engine, obtained by breaking up B50 MX bikes. His reputation grew as a builder of four-stroke motocross bikes that were capable of competing with the dominant two-stroke bikes. In the mid-1970s, the CCM racing team achieved respectable results in the 500 cc Motocross World Championship, with rider John Banks placing in the top five several times.

Initially powered by BSA engines, the firm used Rotax engines during the 1980s and 1990s when production reached a peak of 3,500 annually. Between 1983 and 1985, over 4,000 CCM motorcycles were licensed to export bikes to North America badged as Can-Am motorcycles.

In 1984, the firm secured a contract to produce the Rotax-engined Armstrong MT500 bikes for the British Army, and through overseas sales won a Queen's Export Award. The MT500 began as the Italian SWM XN Tornado, to which Armstrong acquired the rights in 1984 when SWM liquidated, and Armstrong modified it for military use. Harley-Davidson bought the production rights to the MT-500 in 1987 when NATO chose the machine, and created a 350 cc version that reduced weight, added an electric start, and upgrading pollution standards, which was named the Harley-Davidson MT350E.

== Return to Clews ownership ==
The CCM company was acquired by the Robson family in 1998 who procured Suzuki DR-Z400 engines. In 2004, the company ceased operations and its assets were bought back by the original owner, Alan Clews. In 2005 the company launched two new bikes, the R35 Supermoto and the FT35 flat tracker. The firm returned to world champion competition, fielding a team in the 2009 FIM Motocross World Championship with riders Tom Church, Jason Dougan and Ray Rowson.

2010 saw CCM working with the military once again, with a contract of 1500 motorcycles, however CCM weren't just content with military sales, they went on to secure their first ACU British Indoor Motocross Championship with Tom Church on board a CCM.

== CCM GP450 ==
In 2013 CCM announced plans for a GP450 machine to meet a market demand for a road legal middleweight adventure bike. A prototype was made available to journalists for testing in 2014, and the first bikes rolled off the production line in November 2014.

The GP450 is very light at 125 kg (dry), which is 98 kg lighter than the popular BMW R1200GS Adventure. The GP450 has a frame of "Bond-Lite" aluminium, which CCM claim as a world first. The bought-in engine is a BMW 450cc 4-stroke single, detuned from 51 hp to 41 hp. Originally used in the discontinued BMW GP450X, the 450cc engine is now built by Kymco in Taiwan. The CCM has received very favourable comments on its lightness, the engine's responsiveness, and the excellent handling both on- and off-road. The factory team of 11 workers is currently producing eight bikes per week.

2016 saw an "RS" version produced which had 17" wheels instead of the standard 21/18" setup.

Production of the GP450 ceased in 2017 due to the replacement of Euro 3 with Euro 4 emission standards and the engine not being able to meet the stricter certification standards. Cafe racers, Scramblers also made 450 to 600cc.

== CCM Spitfire ==
Due to the Euro 4 emissions standards the GP450 was phased out since the engine was not compliant with this regulation. A group of CCM employees set about designing a new machine which was to be hand welded from T45 carbon steel and covered with a clear lacquer enabling the welds to be seen. The first prototype was unveiled in late 2016 and four further models were added to the range.
