= Cactus Air Force Wings and Wheels Museum =

American non-profit organization

- Location within Nevada
- Type: Nonprofit
- Coordinates: 39.1914°N 119.7400°W
- Website: www.cactusairforce.com

The Cactus Air Force Wings and Wheels Museum is a non-profit organization located at the Carson City Airport in Carson City, Nevada.

== History ==
The organization acquired four O-2s from Davis-Monthan Air Force Base in 1996.

The organization received approval to build a 12,000 sq ft (1,100 m^{2}) facility from the airport authority in May 2013.

The organization sold an S-2 in late 2017.

The organization hosted a campaign rally for Donald Trump in October 2020.

== Collection ==
=== Aircraft ===
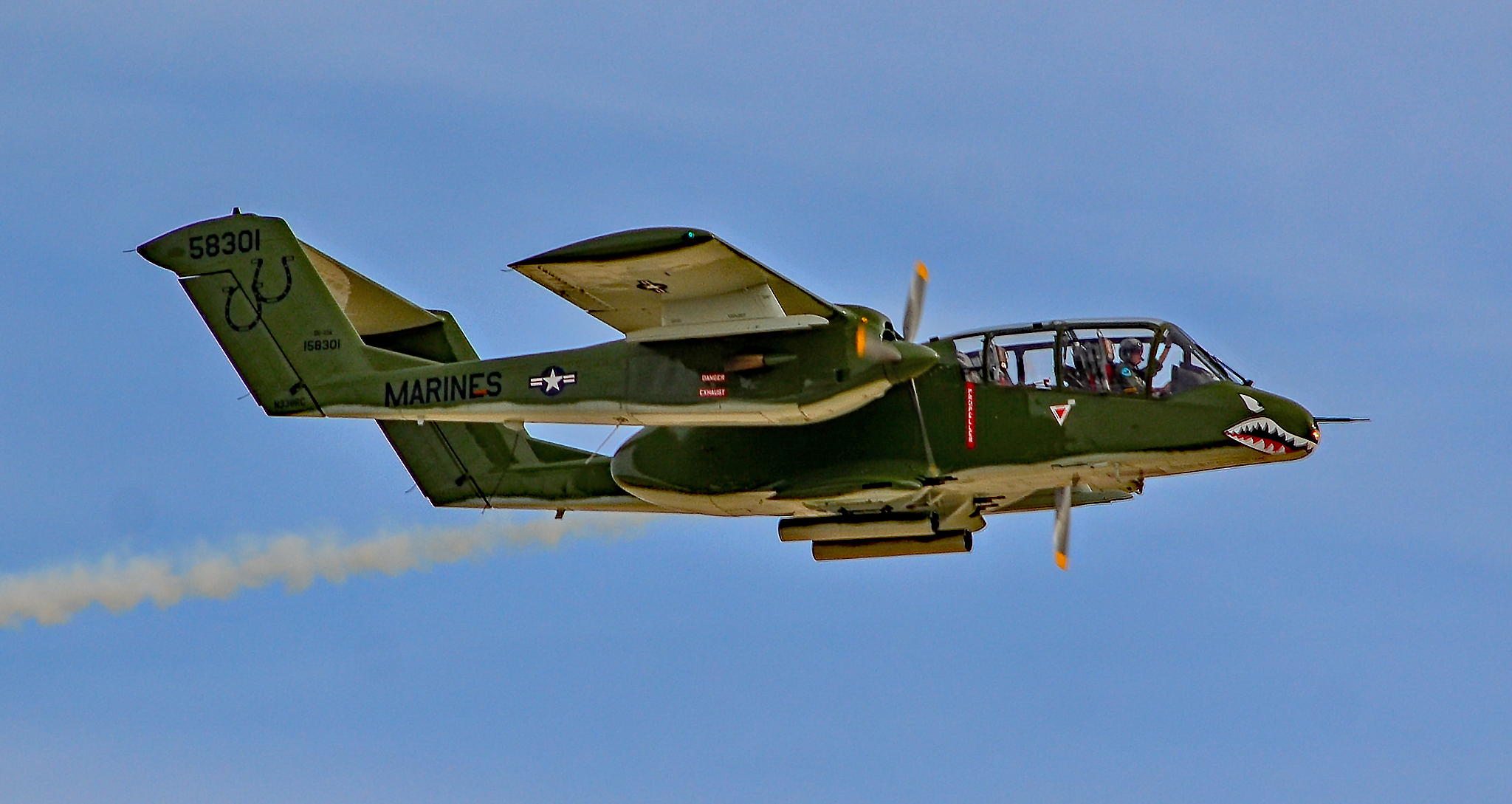
North American Rockwell OV-10B Bronco

- Beechcraft T-34 Mentor
- Beechcraft T-34 Mentor
- Bell AH-1S Cobra
- Bell UH-1 Iroquois
- Cessna 150L
- Cessna L-19 Bird Dog
- Cessna O-2 Skymaster
- Cessna T-41B Mescalero
- Douglas A-26 Invader
- General Dynamics EF-111A Raven
- General Motors TBM Avenger
- Grumman C-1 Trader
- Grumman HU-16 Albatross
- Hughes 269
- Hughes TH-55 Osage
- Lockheed T-33
- McDonnell Douglas F/A-18 Hornet
- Mikoyan-Gurevich MiG-17
- North American T-6G Texan
- North American F-86 Sabre
- North American T-28 Trojan
- North American T-28A Trojan
- North American T-28A Trojan
- North American Rockwell OV-10B Bronco
- Piasecki CH-21
- Piper L-4 Grasshopper
- Sikorsky H-34 Choctaw
- Vultee BT-13A Valiant

=== Ground vehicles ===
- Armstrong MT500
- Fast Attack Vehicle
- Ford GPW
- M113A2
- M151A1
- M20
- M274
- M561
- M973A1 SUSV
- M998 HMMWV

== Events ==
The organization participates in the annual Carson City Airport open house.
