= SWM Motorcycles =

Italian motorcycle manufacturer

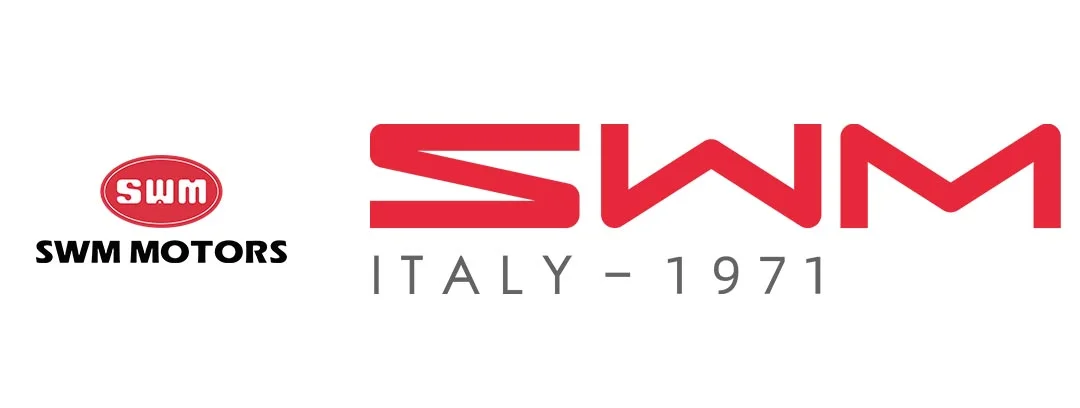
- Type: Subsidiary
- Industry: Motorcycle manufacturing
- Founded: 1971; 55 years ago in Milan
- Founder: Pietro Sironi, Fausto Vergani
- Headquarters: Biandronno, Varese, Italy
- Area served: Worldwide
- Products: Motorcycle
- Website: swm-motorcycles.it

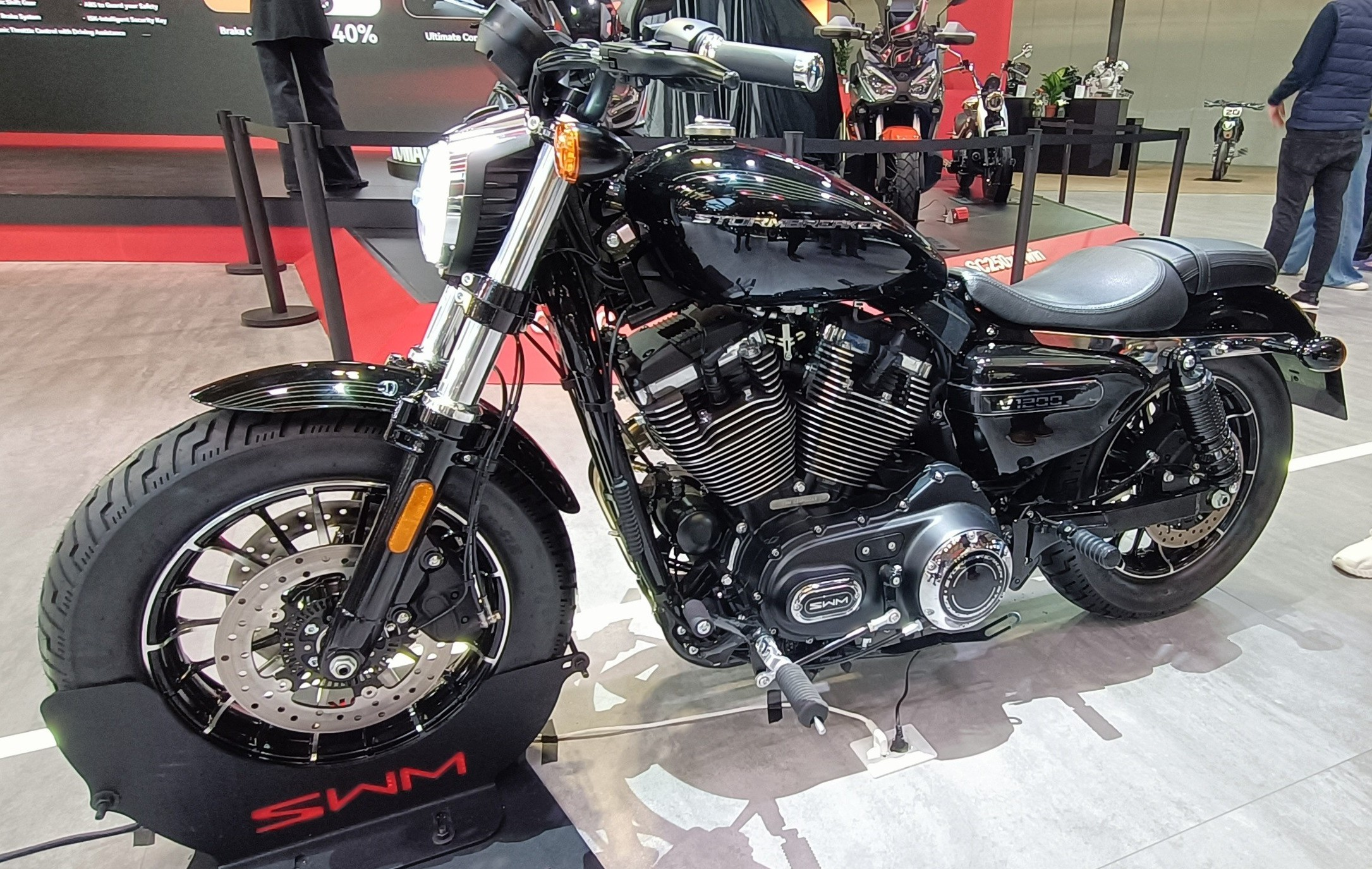
2026 SWM Stormbreaker V1200

SWM Motorcycles is an Italian motorcycle manufacturer founded in 1971 by Piero Sironi and Fausto Vergani and owned by Shineray Group of Chongqing, China. Based in Milan, SWM manufactured Observed Trials, Enduro, Motocross and off-road motorcycles in the 1970s and 1980s. They started with small capacity Sachs engined enduro bikes and began making Rotax engined trials bikes in 1977. The other main manufacturers at this time included Fantic Motor, Bultaco and Montesa.

Making the announcement during EICMA 2014 show in Milan, SWM are back on the market by introducing six street and off-road bikes with engine size between 300 and 650cc.

== History ==
=== Trials Bikes ===
SWM started making Rotax TL125 and TL320 trials bikes in 1977. Rotax built a special trials version of their rotary valve motor, with development input from Sammy Miller and Charles Coutard. Acerbis made the plastic mouldings, and suspension was by Marzocchi. These first trials machines were red and white.

In 1979 yellow and black models appeared, and in 1980 these were fitted with Girling Gas shocks and Betor forks. Gilles Burgat won the 1981 Trials world championship on an SWM.

In 1982 a 240 model was produced with a blue frame, acknowledging Pernod's trials sponsorship.

In 1983 all bikes got alloy swing arms, and the TL350 Jumbo was introduced. This was a new reed valve motor and frame wearing the same yellow and blue colours.

In 1984 the 125 and 320 were put in the new frame, but then production ceased.

=== Enduro Bikes ===
SWM RSGS and SWM TF1 in capacities 125, 175, 250, 280, 350, 370, 440, 506

Joan Riudalbá, riding an SWM TF1 of 125 cc was Enduro Spanish Champion in 1980.

When SWM went into liquidation Armstrong of Bolton, England bought the rights to the SWM XN Tornado, a Rotax engined enduro machine of 350cc or 506 cc. With CCM, Armstrong developed and marketed a military version, the Armstrong MT500, which was so successful Harley-Davidson bought the manufacturing rights in 1986, and further developed the bike as the MT350E.

== SWM today ==
SWM went in liquidation in 1984 and production ceased. There are still people out there riding SWMs in classic and twinshock trials in the UK. Rotax engines spares are still readily available, with many of the other spares that went out of production, like the Acerbis plastics, are being produced and distributed by specialist companies such as MotoSWM in the UK and MidWest SWM in the U.S.

=== 2014 Resurrection ===
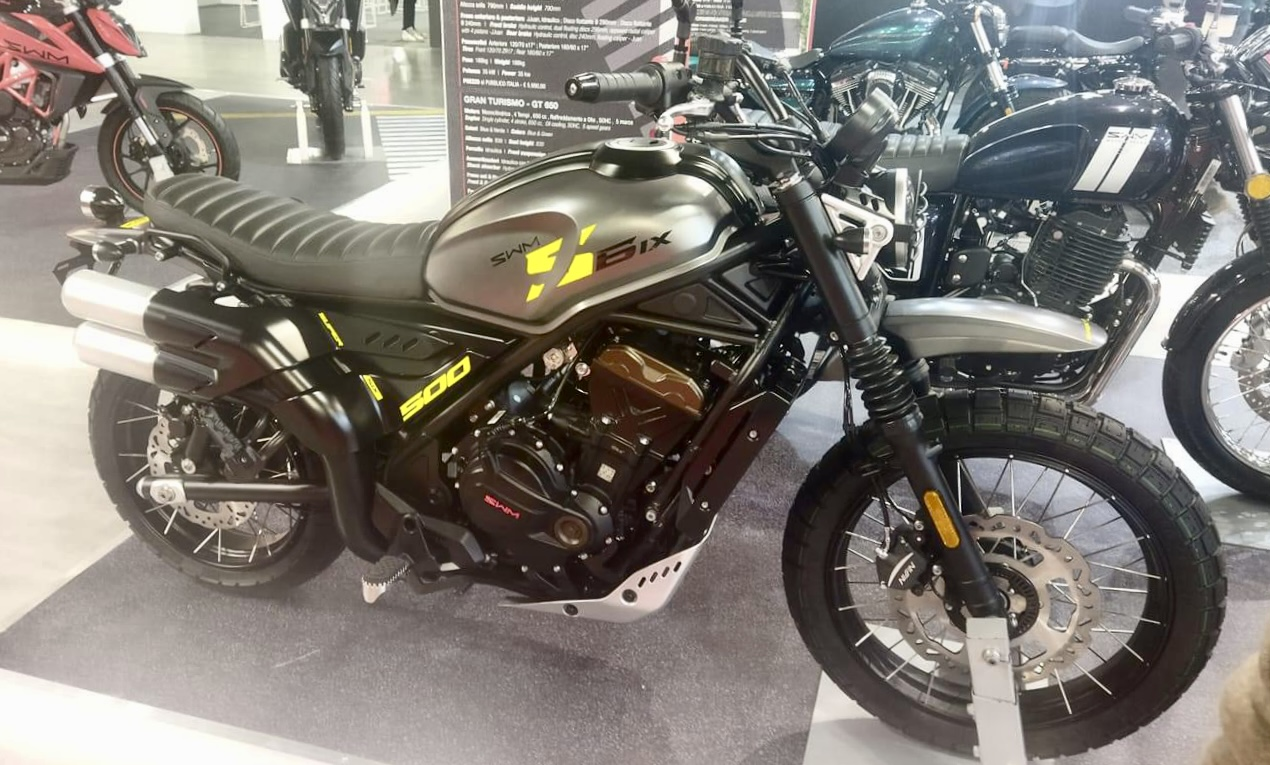
2025 SWM Super Six 500

Engineer Ampelio Macchi, formerly with Cagiva, Aprilia and Husqvarna Motorcycles, is driving the resurgence of the SWM brand with six new models displayed at EICMA 2014. Funding for the company has come from China via the entity Shineray Group. SWM will keep manufacturing in Italy at Biandronno near Varese, in the old factory of Husqvarna (when the brand belonged to the Cagiva Group, now MV Agusta), sold in 2014 by Husqvarna's then owner, the BMW Group. Apparently, some of SWM's engines will be the old Husqvarna engines developed with Cagiva. Current Husqvarnas use KTM engines, following the acquisition by Pierer Mobility AG.

== Current models ==
Enduro

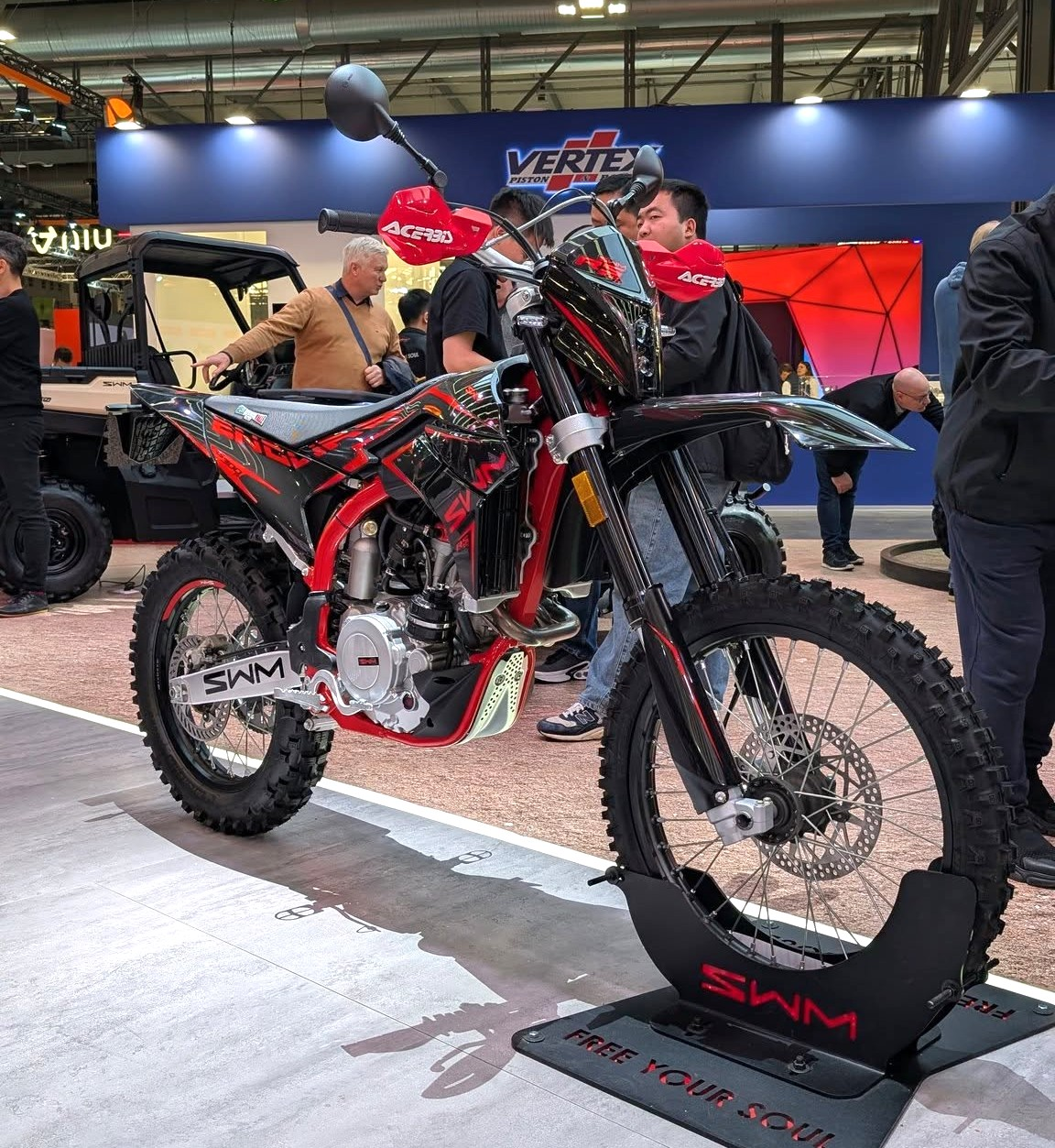
SWM RS 300 R

- RS 125 R
- RS 300 R
- RS 500 R

Motard

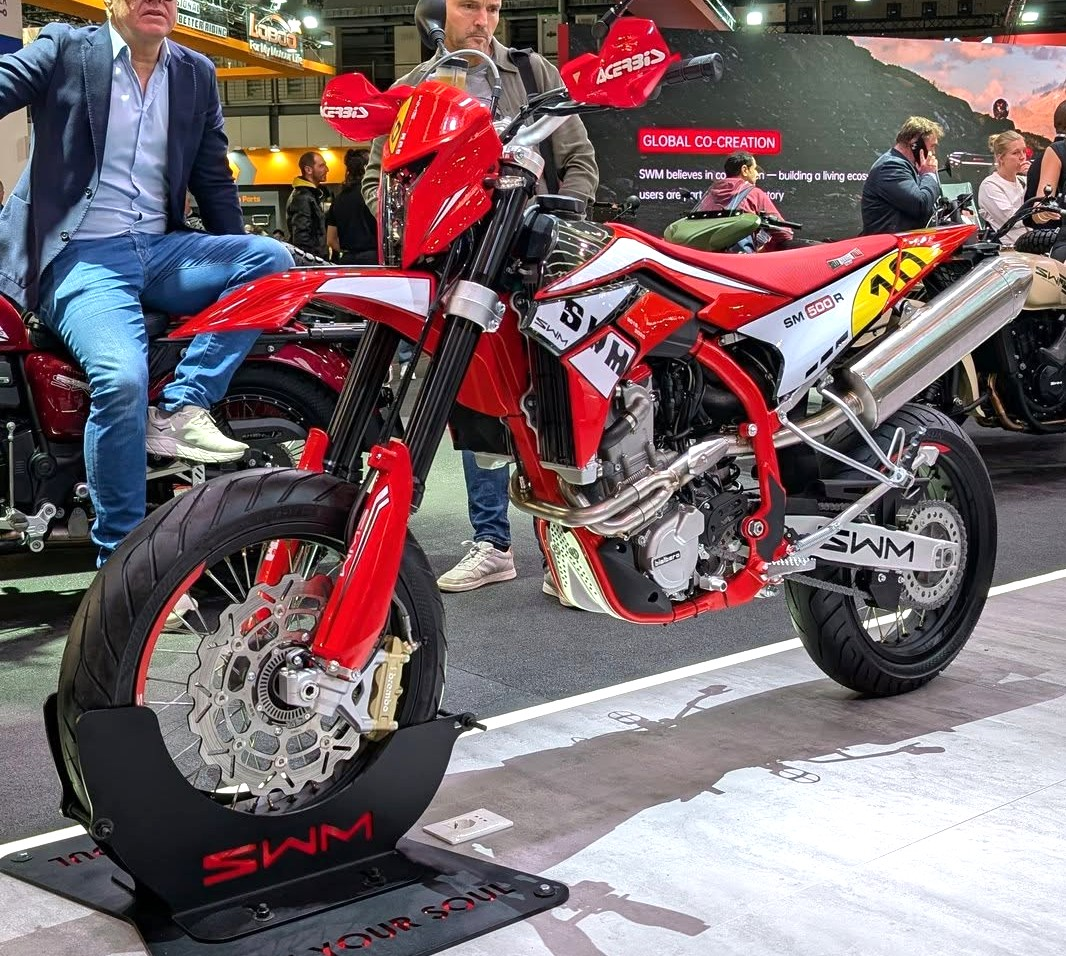
SWM SM 500R

- SM 125 R
- SM 500 R

Dual–Sport

- Superdual X
- Superdual T
- Versante 550

Naked

- Hoku 125
- Hoku 400

Scrambler

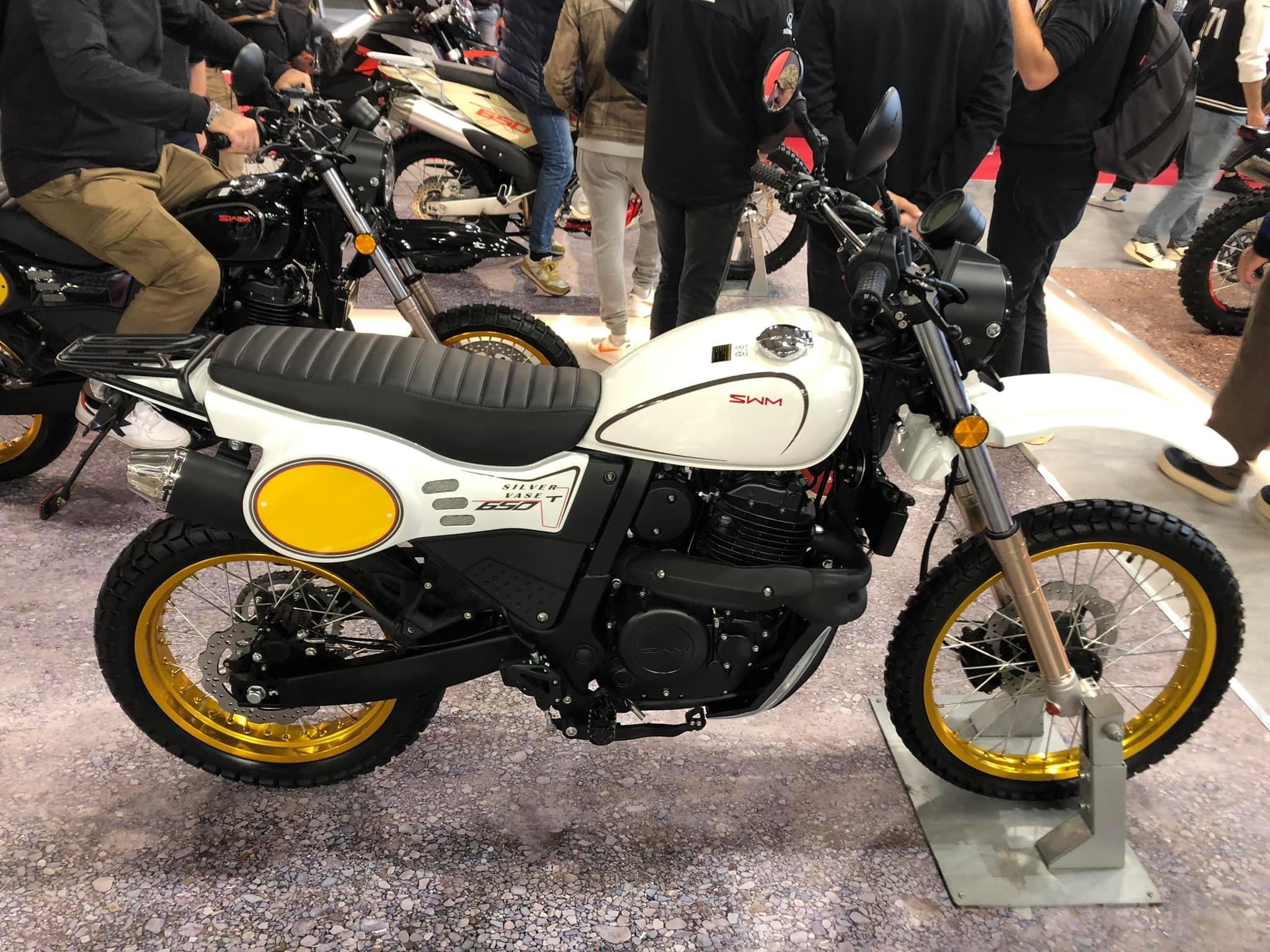
SWM Silver Vase T650

- Supersix
- Silver Vase 650
- Silver Vase T650

Road

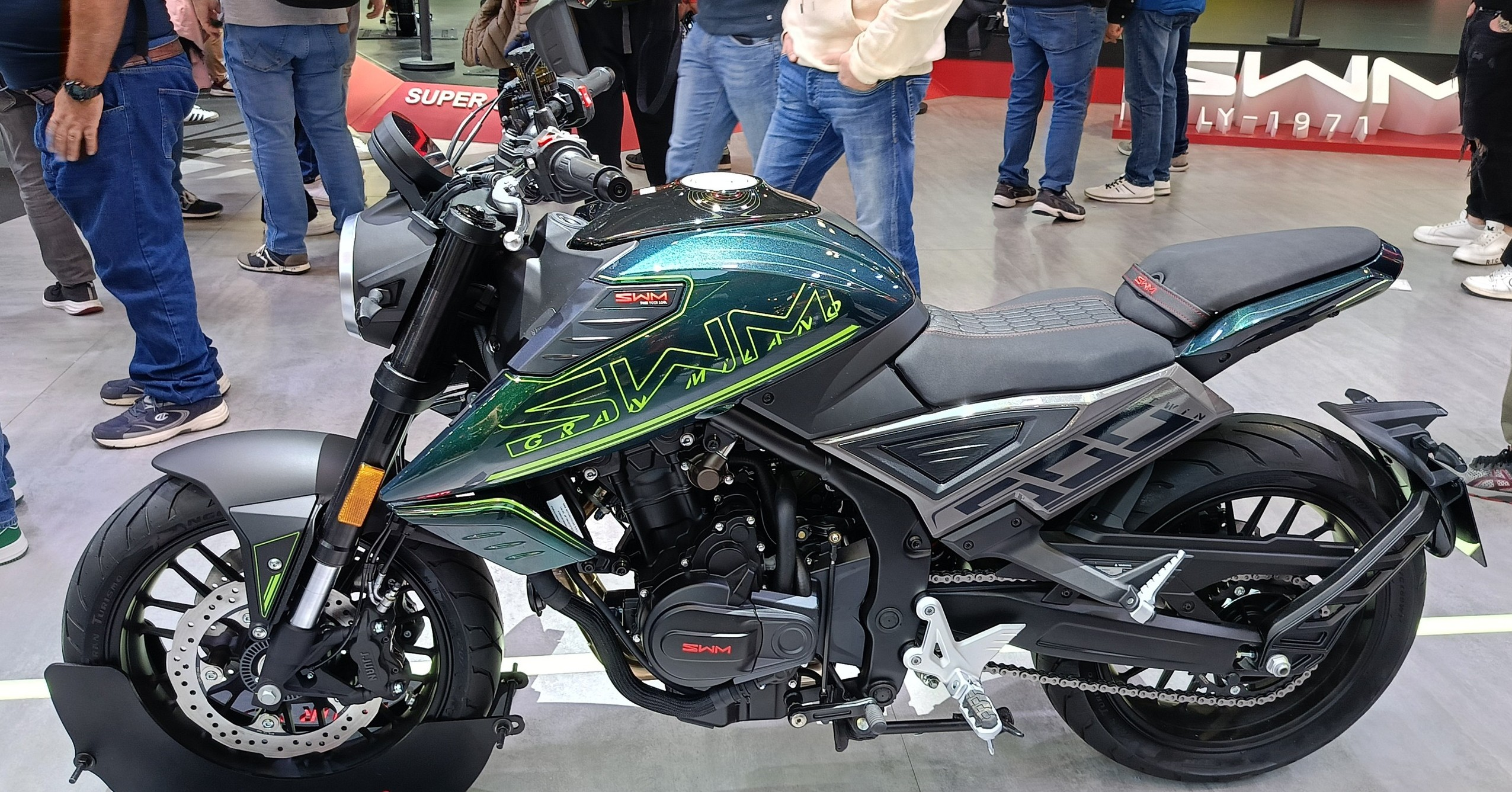
SWM Gran Milano

- Gran Milano
- Gran Turismo 650
- Stormbraker V1200
- Sidecar Urban 525

Scooters

- Venturo 125
- C Fly 125

E–Bikes

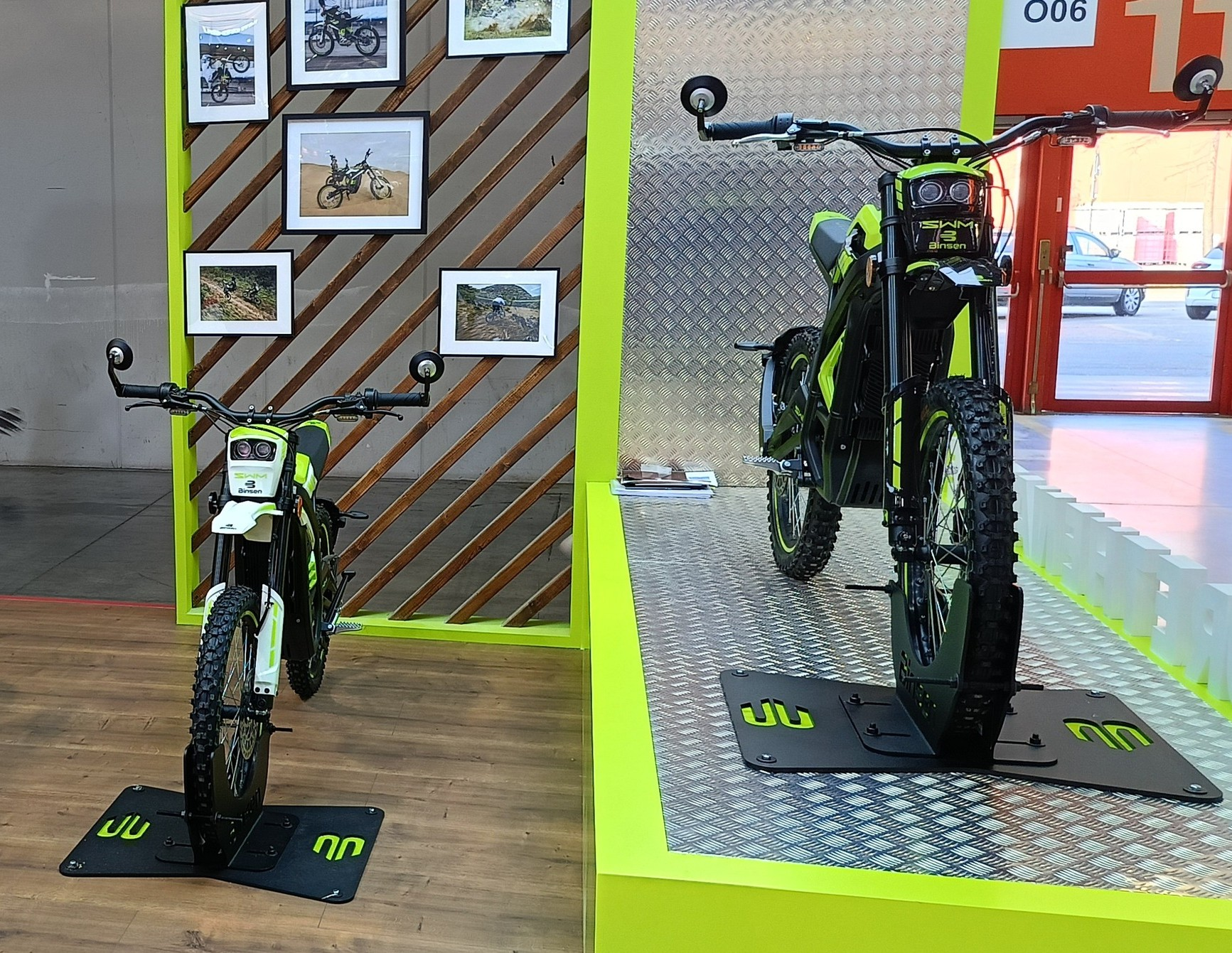
SWM Binsen Pro and Dirt Bike

- Binsen Dirt Bike
- Binsen Pro

== See also ==
- List of Italian companies
- List of motorcycle manufacturers
