= Harley-Davidson Model 1 =

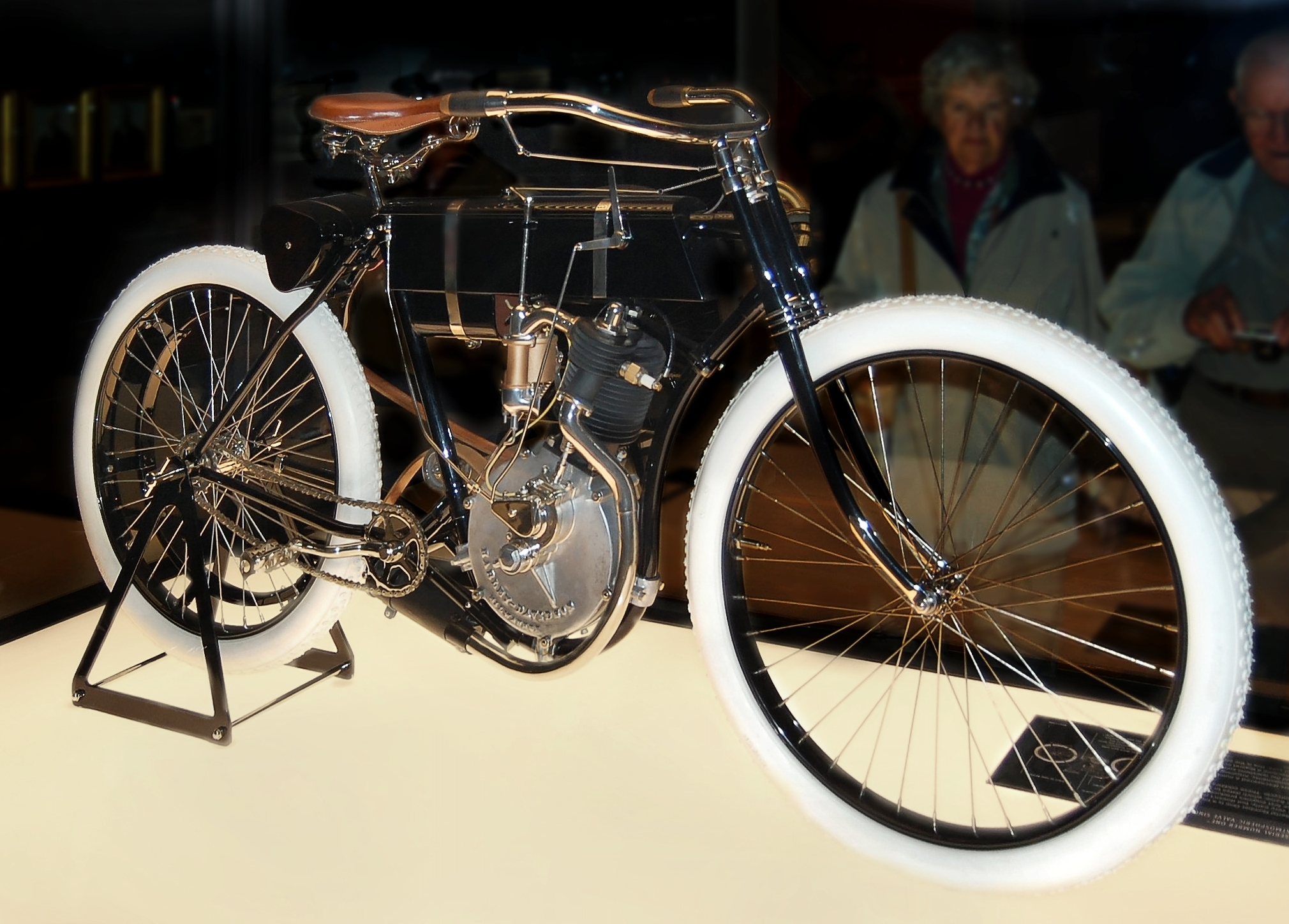
- Manufacturer: Harley-Davidson
- Production: 1903-1905
- Class: Standard
- Engine: 440cc single-cylinder four-stroke engine
- Top speed: 56 km/h (35 mph)
- Power: 3 kW (4 hp)

The Harley-Davidson Model 1 was the first motorcycle produced by the American manufacturer Harley-Davidson. The purchase price was 200 US dollars; 38 copies were made.

== History ==
William S. Harley and Arthur Davidson developed the first prototype of a Harley Davidson motorcycle in 1903. The engine was designed according to the system De Dion-Bouton, had a displacement of 167 cc and made about 2 ps (1.5 kW). Since Harley and Davidson were dissatisfied with the performance, in 1904, cubic capacity was increased to 405 cm^{3} at one of bore 76 mm and one stroke 89 mm. From this pre-production model came two copies. No original photographs or dated documents of this motorcycle claimed to be built in 1903, exist.

== See also ==
- List of Harley-Davidson motorcycles
- List of motorcycles of 1900 to 1909
