= Harley-Davidson Freewheeler =

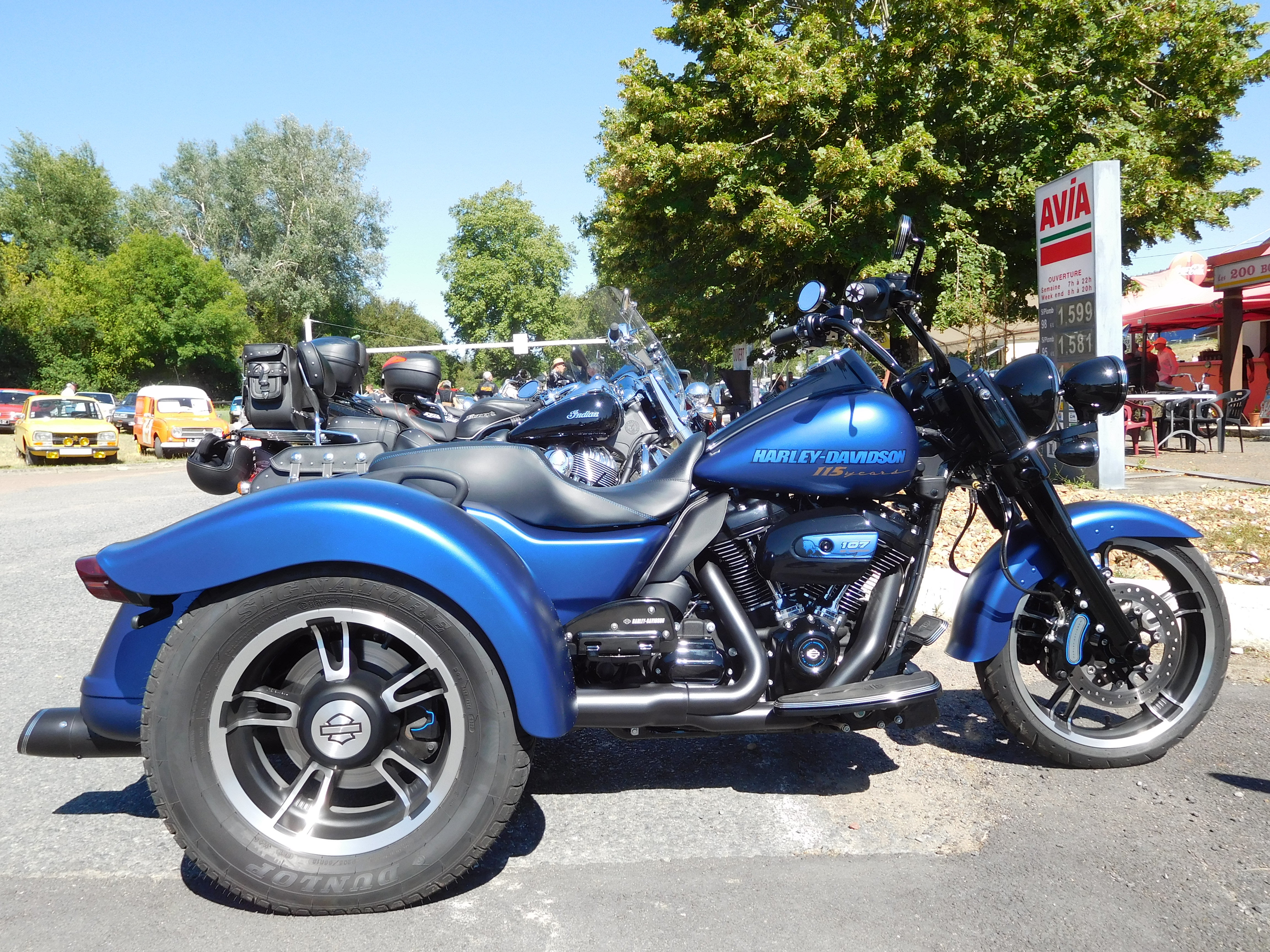
- Production: 2014–present
- Engine: 1,690 cc air-cooled V-twin
- Torque: 104.7 lb⋅ft (142.0 N⋅m) @ 3250 RPM (claimed)
- Tires: Front: 19 in. Rear: 15 in.
- Weight: 1,082 lb (491 kg) (claimed) (dry)
- Fuel capacity: 6 US gal (23 L; 5.0 imp gal)
- Fuel consumption: 39 mpg_{‑US} (6.0 L/100 km; 47 mpg_{‑imp}) (claimed)
- Related: Tri Glide Ultra Classic

The Harley-Davidson Freewheeler is a motorized tricycle introduced by Harley-Davidson in August, 2014 for the 2015 model year. It is designated the FLRT.

It has a 1,690 cc displacement, air-cooled, V-twin engine with 142 N⋅m (105 lbf⋅ft) torque and a six-speed transmission with reverse.

The model is distinguished from the other Harley three-wheeler, the Tri Glide Ultra Classic, by having mini ape hanger handlebars and bobtail fenders for a low profile.

The 2017 offering sports the new 107 cubic inch Milwaukee 8 engine.

The 2019 offering sports the new 114 cubic inch Milwaukee 8 engine.

== See also ==
- List of Harley-Davidson motorcycles
- List of motorized trikes
