= Harley-Davidson Baja 100 =

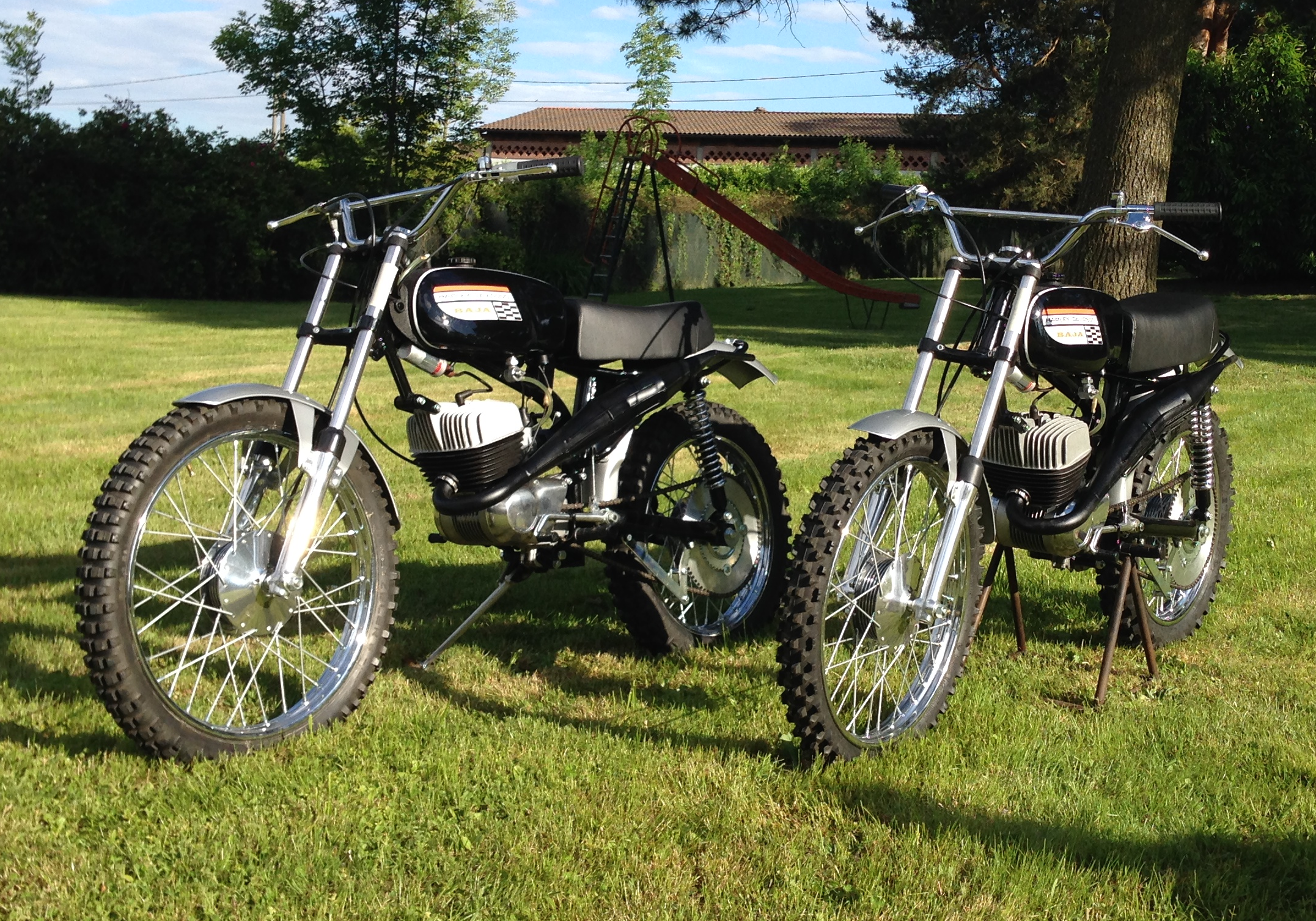
- Two 1970 Baja 100s
- Manufacturer: Aermacchi
- Production: 1969–1972 (model years 1970–1973)
- Assembly: Varese, Italy
- Class: Off-road
- Engine: 98 cc (5.98 cu in) 2-stroke single
- Bore / stroke: 50 mm × 50 mm (1.97 in × 1.97 in)
- Compression ratio: 9.5:1
- Power: 12.6 bhp (9.4 kW) @ 8,000 rpm
- Transmission: 5 speed
- Tires: Metzeler front: 3.00 × 21, rear: 3.50 × 18
- Wheelbase: 52 in (1,300 mm)
- Dimensions: L: 78.5 in (1,990 mm); W: 34 in (860 mm)
- Weight: 185 lb (84 kg) (dry)
- Fuel capacity: 2.5 US gal (9.5 L; 2.1 imp gal), including 1 US qt (0.95 L) reserve.

The Harley-Davidson Baja 100 was a small displacement off-road motorcycle made for Harley-Davidson in Italy by Aermacchi, which was 50% owned by Harley-Davidson at the time. It was one of Harley-Davidson's attempts to enter the small displacement off-road motorcycle market. It was built in Aermacchi's Varese, Italy factory.

It had a 98 cc (6.0 cu in) two-stroke, single cylinder engine with five speed transmission, derived from the current two-stroke production, mostly Aletta and Aletta d'Oro off the shelf parts by reducing bore from 56 mm to 50 mm.

The only purpose-made part was the frame to accommodate for the front holder for the cylinder head and the air filter box.

== Production runs ==
The first production run started in September 1969 and ended just before August, traditionally the time of the year when factories were closed for holidays and consequently a new model year introduced.

Production

- 1969: 853 MY ’70 MSR
- 1970: 569 MSR MY ’70 MSR
- 1970: 1204 MSR MY ’71
- 1971: 704 MY ’72 SR and 200 MY ’72 MSR
- 1972: 1008 MY 73 MSR

Production runs of 1973 are not known even if some MY 74 models seem to exist but this means that there have been no changes after MY73.

As a rule frame numbers (which are repeated on the engine) start with 8B on the MSR (Competition Model) and 8C for the "street model" which had lights, muffler and a high front fender. But for some early "street models" the MSR frame numbering may apply.

A major overhaul took place end of 1972 when the engine was fitted with a new aluminum cylinder and carburetor, and gear shift on the right side of the engine. There were other minor differences such as the rear fork or the missing vent on the tank.

The Baja had a racing history and won the Baja 1000 in 1971 with the official Harley-Davidson team in its class. In that race Harley entered some 14 Baja models, of which 8 finished in the top 10, including the race winner.

== See also ==
- List of Harley-Davidson motorcycles
