= Armstrong-CCM Motorcycles =

British motorcycle manufacturer

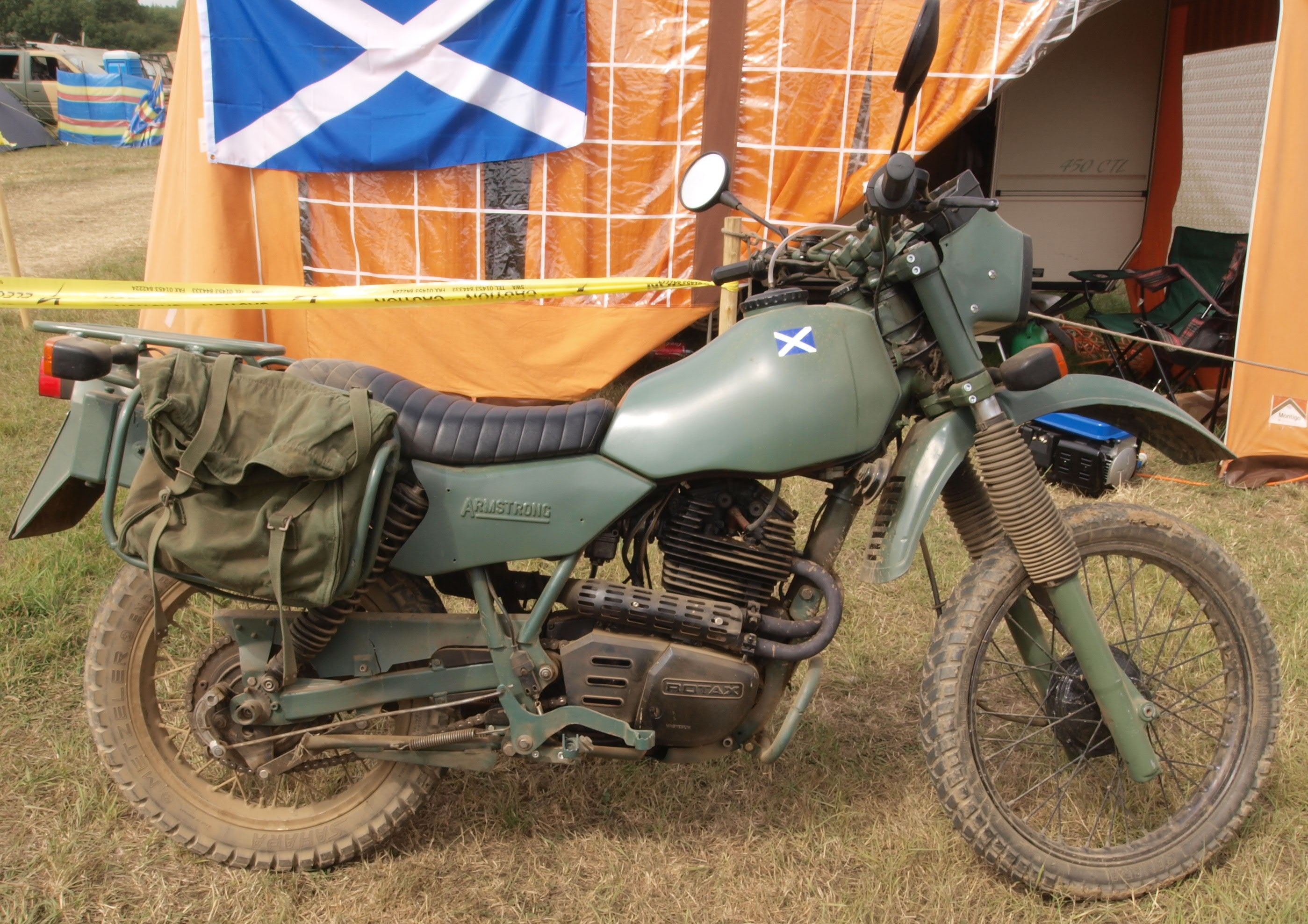
- Industry: Manufacturing and engineering
- Founded: 1980
- Defunct: 1987
- Fate: Sold to CCM
- Successor: CCM
- Headquarters: Bolton, England
- Key people: Alan Clews
- Products: Motorcycles
- Website: CCM Motorcycles

Armstrong-CCM Motorcycles was a British motorcycle manufacturer based in Bolton, England. Alan Clews formed CCM in 1971 from what was left of BSA's off-road competition team and bought spares to produce his own motorcycles. Later, its Bolton factory was established.

In 1981, Armstrong bought a majority share, and Clews designed a road race competition motorcycle. They acquired the rights to the Rotax engine-enduro motorcycle SWM XN Tornado from the Italian owners and developed the Armstrong MT500 military motorcycle used by the British Army.

For most of the 1980s, Armstrong-CCM produced about 3,500 motocross and trail bikes, as well as military off-road machines. Electric starter models were built for the Jordanian and Canadian armed forces.

In 1983, the Bombardier Corporation licensed the brand and outsourced development and production of the Can-Am motorcycles to Armstrong-CCM, who produced Can-Ams until closure in 1987, when Armstrong sold the military motorcycle business to Harley Davidson and CCM back to Clews, who continue to produce motorcycles as of 2010.

Also in 1983, Armstrong produced a 250-cc Grand Prix motorcycle using a carbon fiber frame. Following the technology being used by the Formula One industry, Armstrong designers Mike Eatough and Barry Hart created the first motorcycle using a carbon fiber frame to compete in Grand Prix racing.

Armstrong's road racing department including plans, remaining stock, tooling and manufacturing rights were sold to Colin Hopper of CWH Developments in Lancashire. CWH produced the 350 cc CM36 engine for several years in the form of the CWH Armstrong F2 sidecar outfit and supplied parts for solo machines that were campaigned in races such as the Isle of Man TT and Manx Grand Prix up until the late 1990s. CWH's Armstrong equipment was later sold to a Super Kart manufacturer in Bolton, who in 2009 passed the CWH-Armstrong concern onto Rave Motorsports Ltd. in Surrey.

The company initially produced spare parts for existing machines with plans to re-manufacture replicas of the Armstrong CM36 250 cc and 350 cc road racers for the Post-Classic racing series. An official Rave Motorsport / Armstrong Road Racing relaunch was scheduled to take place at the Vintage Motorcycle Club's Festival of 1000 bikes at Mallory Park in July 2010, with several of the ex-Armstrong GP and TT riders displaying their machines.
