= Harley-Davidson Servi-Car =

Motorcycle manufactured by Harley-Davidson

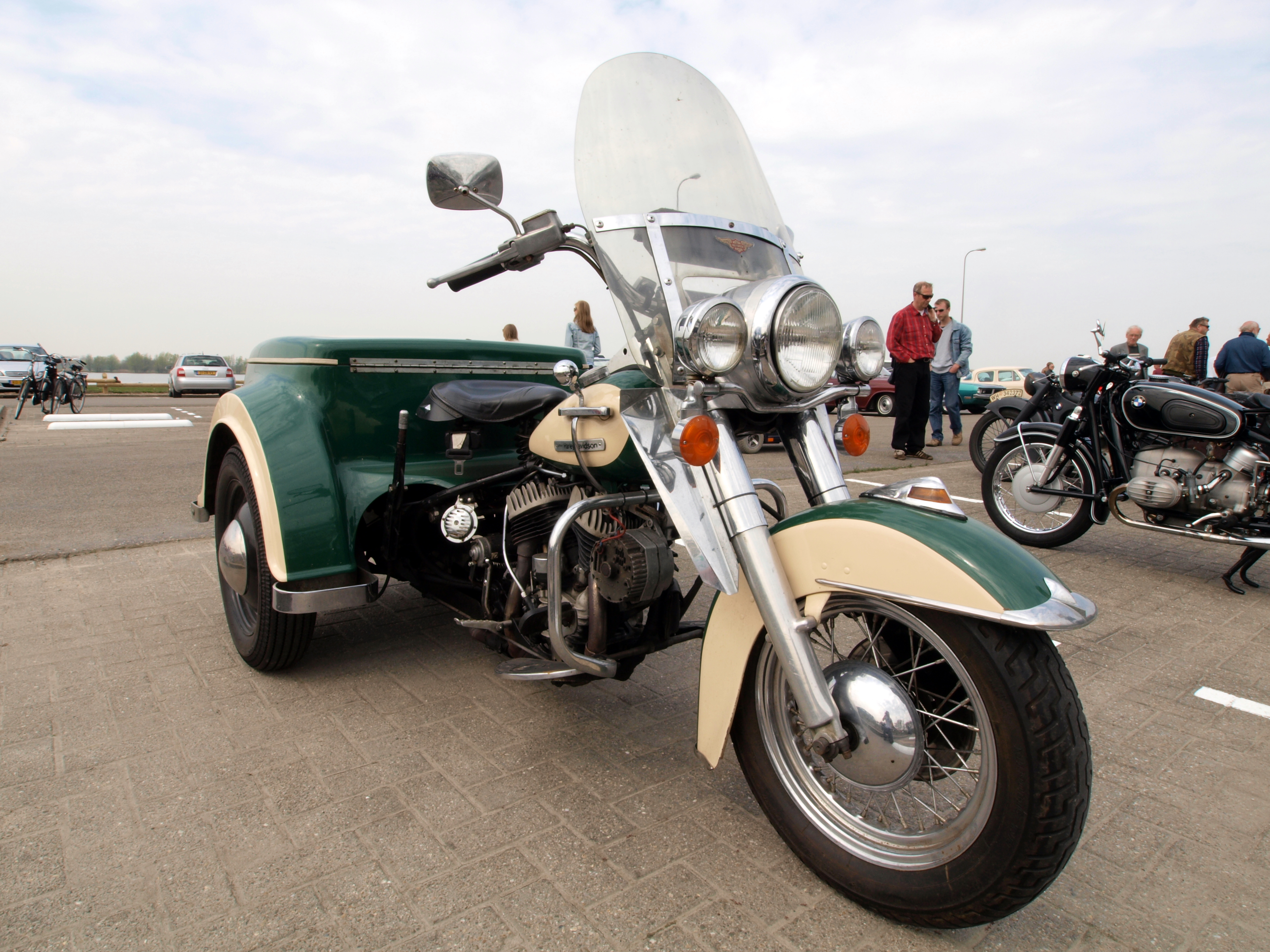
Harley-Davidson Servi-Car

The Harley-Davidson Servi-Car is a three-wheeled utility motorcycle that was manufactured by Harley-Davidson from 1932 to 1973.

== Concept and uses ==
The Servi-Car was designed during the Great Depression when Harley-Davidson was desperate to expand its product base to increase sales. Targeted at the automotive service industry, the vehicle was designed for assisting at roadside breakdowns and delivering cars to customers. For this reason, it was available with a tow bar at the front and a large 60 Ah battery. (The tow bar was used to tow the Servicar from the rear of a car, not vice-versa). It allowed one person to transfer a car from one location to another and drive themselves back; after driving the car to its destination, the delivery driver would unhitch the Servi-Car and ride it back to the garage.

In addition to its intended use for car delivery and retrieval, the Servi-Car was also popular as a utility vehicle for small businesses and mobile vendors. It proved to be particularly popular with police departments, some of which still used Servi-Cars into the 1990s.

== Models ==
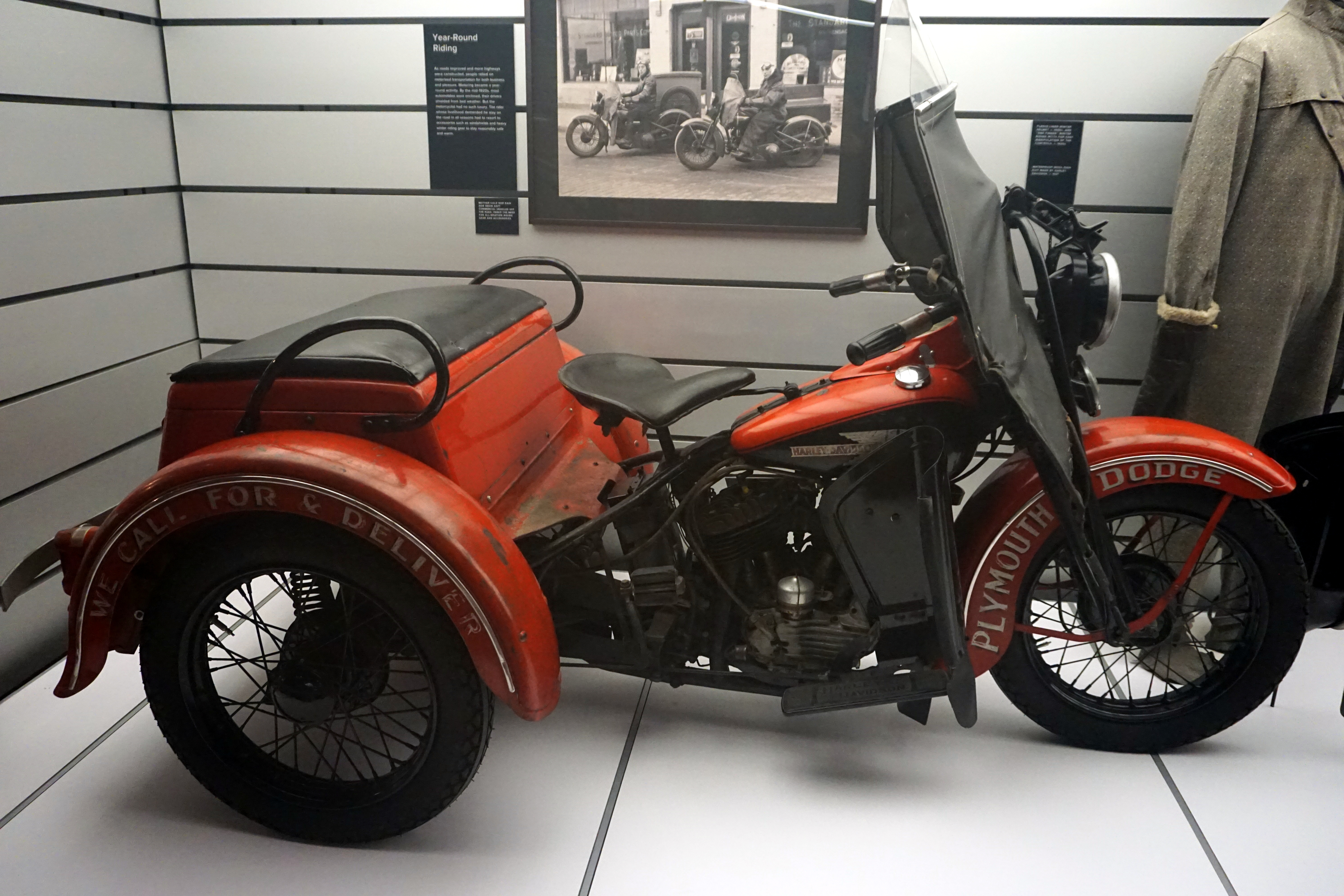
1939 Harley-Davidson Model G Servi-Car at the Harley-Davidson Museum in Milwaukee

The models offered in 1932, the first year of production, were:

- G - with small box and tow bar
- GA - with small box and no tow bar
- GD - with large box and no tow bar
- GE - with large box and air tank

In 1933, the GDT, with large box and tow bar, was added to the line.

In 1942, the small and large boxes were replaced with a standardized intermediate-sized box that was manufactured for Harley-Davidson by the Chas. Abresch Co. in Milwaukee, Wisconsin. A gold, red, and black water transfer decal from this company was affixed to the top inside of the box lid. This box continued to be installed until 1966, after which it was replaced by a fiberglass box; all preceding boxes were made from steel.

== Engine ==
The Servi-Car used variations of Harley-Davidson's 45 cubic inch flathead. From 1932 to 36, the Servi-Car used the engine from the solo R model. It was changed in 1937 to the engine used in the W model, which differed mainly in having a recirculating oil system instead of the constant-loss system of the R. The "W" flathead engine continued until the end of production in 1973, despite the "W" solo series being replaced by the "K" series in 1952.

An electric starter became available on the Servi-Car in 1964, making it the first civilian Harley with an electric starter, one year before the debut of the Electra Glide.

== Transmission ==
When the Servi-Car was introduced in 1932, it used the same transmission as the R solo model. This was replaced the next year by a constant-mesh transmission with three speeds and a reverse gear.

== Chassis and suspension ==
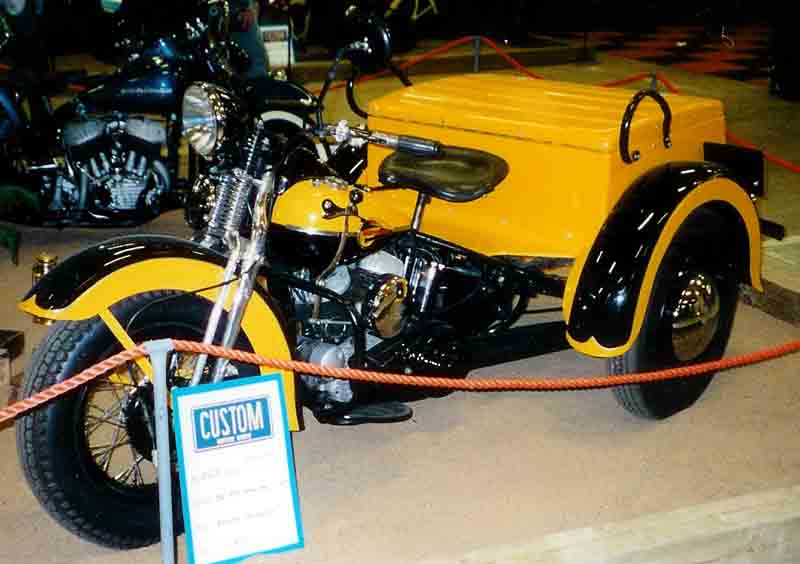
Early Servi-Car with springer forks

The Servi-Car was designed in the early part of the Great Depression for the conditions of its day, in which roads might be crude and unpaved. It has a rigid rear axle with a differential. The rear axle has a track of 42 inches (1,100 mm).

A prototype of the Servi-Car with rear suspension was tested but found to be unstable. The production model's axle is mounted directly to the frame with no suspension at all.

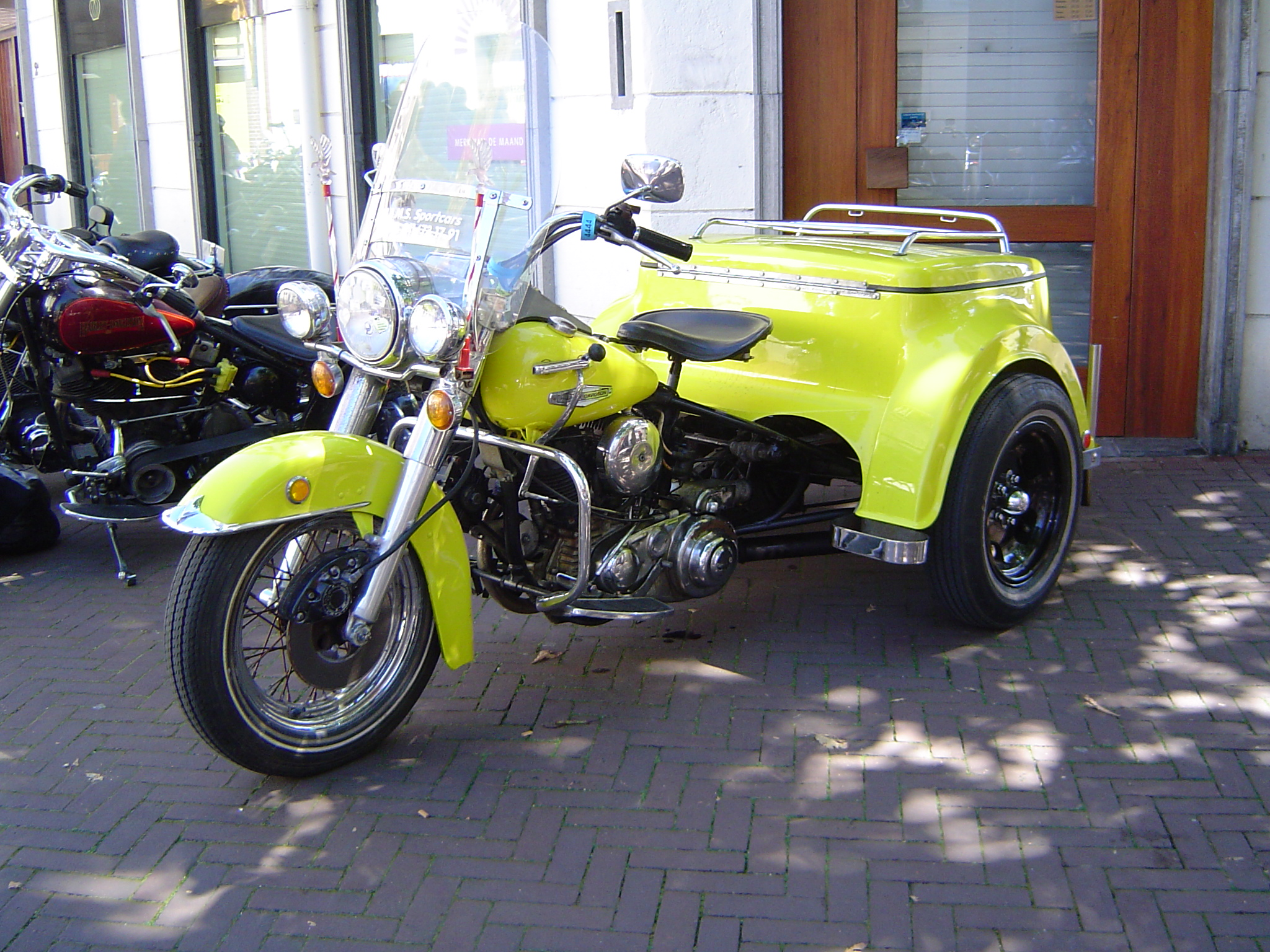
Servi-Car with Hydra-Glide forks and disc brake

Until 1957, the front forks of the Servi-Car were the springer-type leading-link forks used on the R-series and W-series solo motorcycles. From 1958 on, the Servi-Car's neck stem length and inner diameter were changed to fit Hydra-Glide front forks.

== Brakes ==
Early production Servi-Cars have a drum brake on the front wheel and another drum brake inside the rear axle housing, decelerating both rear wheels. In 1937, the braking system was upgraded to have a drum brake on each wheel. A hydraulic rear brake system was introduced in 1951. The very last Servi-Cars, built late in their last model year, have disc brakes on all three wheels.

== See also ==
- List of Harley-Davidson motorcycles
- List of motorized trikes
- List of motorcycles of the 1930s
