= Harley-Davidson RL 45 =

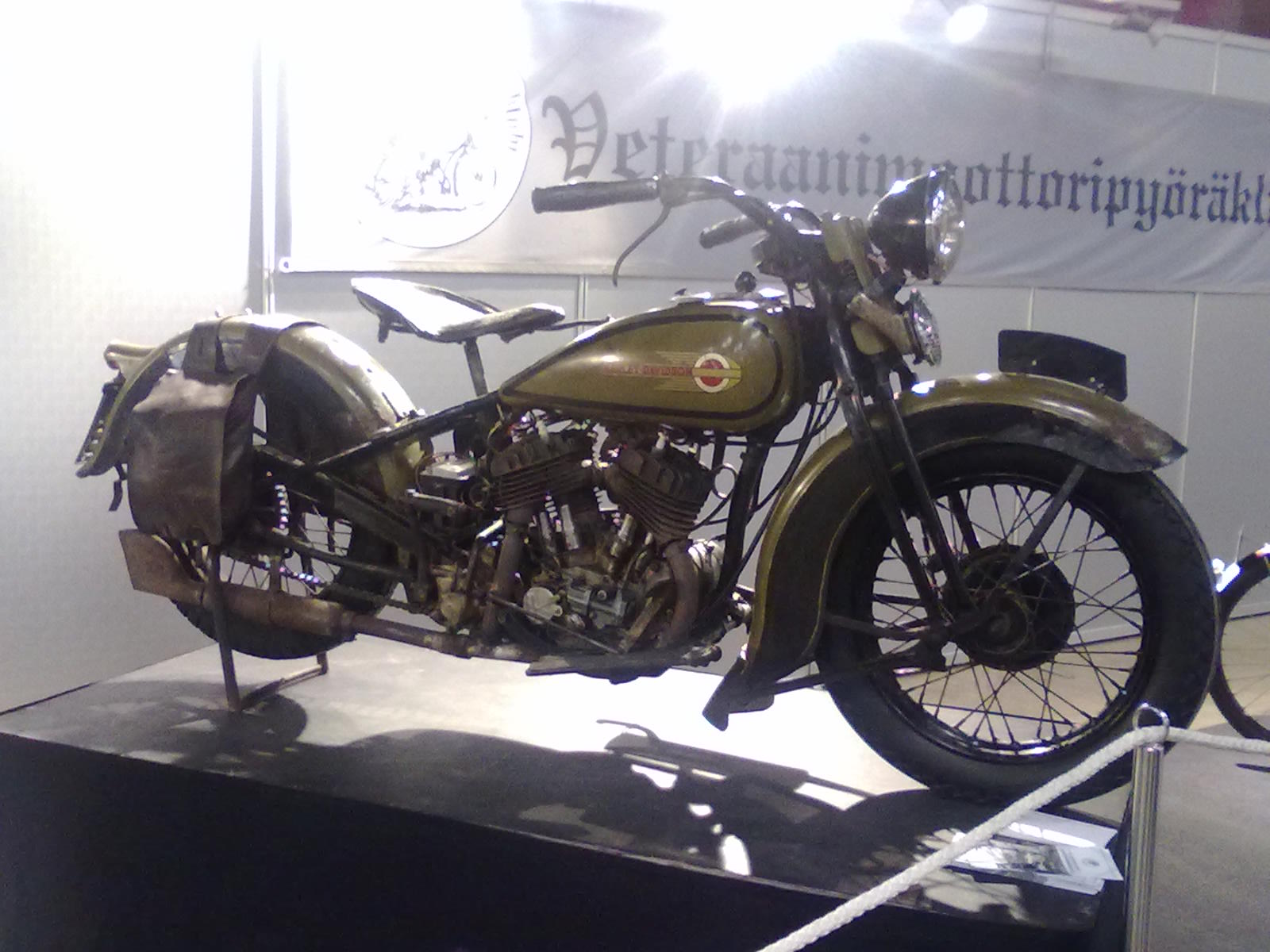
- Manufacturer: Harley-Davidson
- Production: 1932–1936
- Assembly: Milwaukee, WI USA
- Predecessor: D 45
- Successor: W 45
- Class: standard
- Engine: 45.32 cu in (742.7 cc) flathead V-twin
- Bore / stroke: 2.75 in × 3.81 in (70 mm × 97 mm)
- Top speed: 70 mph (110 km/h)
- Power: 18.5 hp (13.8 kW)
- Ignition type: 6 V, coil and points
- Transmission: 3-speed
- Frame type: Steel, single downtube
- Suspension: Front: Leading link spring fork Rear: None, rigid
- Brakes: Front: expanding shoe Rear: contracting band
- Tires: 4.00 x 18
- Wheelbase: 57.5 in (1,460 mm)
- Weight: 390 lb (180 kg) (dry)

The Harley-Davidson RL 45 is a model of the R-series range produced from 1932 to 1936, preceded by the DL range (1929–1931), which was Harley-Davidson's first 45 cubic-inch and first flathead V-twin motorcycle, and succeeded in 1937 by the WL. The R-series range included 45-solo, R, RL and RLD models. The RL, like the DL before it, featured a total-loss oiling system; the following WL had a recirculating oil system.

== Overview ==
Despite being launched in the middle of the Great Depression, when Harley-Davidson's sales were at a twenty-year low, the RL continued in production, helping Harley-Davidson to become one of only two American motorcycle manufacturers to survive the Depression. Influenced by the way in which the automobile industry had used Art Deco stylings, Harley featured a stylized Art Deco style image on the motorcycle's fuel tank.

Harley offered a competition-bred RLDR 45, and also produced a three-wheel Servi-Car (or 'Service-Car') model.

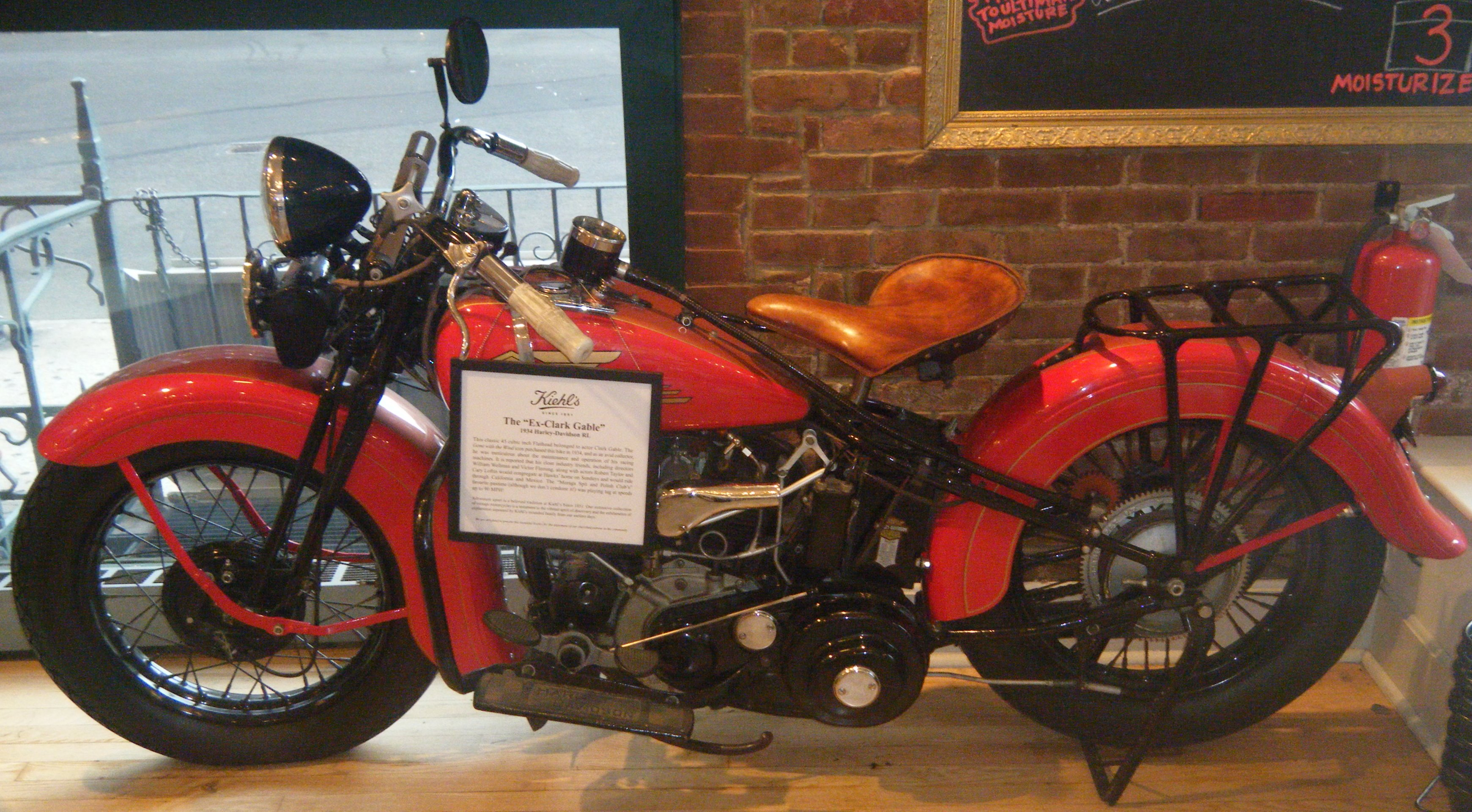
Clark Gable's 1934 Harley-Davidson RL45

Prior to the Second World War, Harley's RL Sports model and Servi-Car were produced in Japan under license to the company Rikuo (Rikuo Internal Combustion Company).

A red 1934 RL45 was owned by Hollywood star Clark Gable.

== See also ==
- List of Harley-Davidson motorcycles
