= Armstrong MT500 =

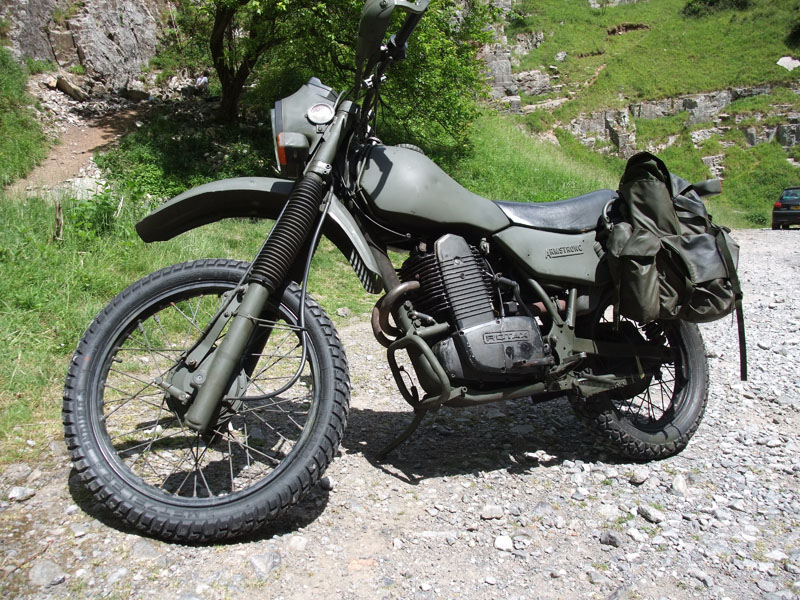
- Manufacturer: Armstrong-CCM Motorcycles
- Production: 1983–1987
- Engine: 481.3 cc (29.37 cu in) Rotax 504mil air-cooled SOHC 4-valve single-cylinder
- Power: 32 bhp (24 kW) @ 6,200 rpm
- Torque: 38 N⋅m (28 lb⋅ft) @ 5,500 rpm
- Transmission: 5-speed, chain drive
- Wheelbase: 145 cm (57 in)
- Dimensions: L: 217 cm (85 in); W: 79 cm (31 in)
- Weight: 161 kg (355 lb) (dry)
- Fuel capacity: 13 L (2.9 imp gal)

The Armstrong MT500 is a British military motorcycle made by Armstrong-CCM Motorcycles in Bolton, Greater Manchester, who acquired the rights to the Rotax engine enduro motorcycle SWM XN Tornado from the Italian owners and developed the MT500 for use by the British Army. Electric start models were built for the Canadian and Jordanian armed forces.

In 1987, the design and production rights were sold to Harley-Davidson, who in 1993 released the MT350E. The MT500 is used by Canada, Jordan and the United Kingdom.

== Users ==
- Canada
- Jordan
- United Kingdom

== See also ==
- Can Am Bombardier
- Peugeot SX8
