= Harley-Davidson MT350E =

Harley-Davidson MT350
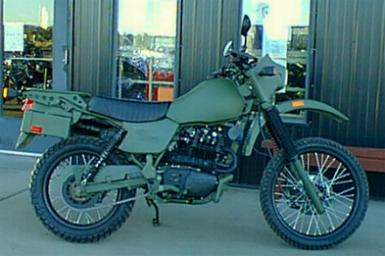
- Manufacturer: Harley-Davidson
- Predecessor: Armstrong MT500
- Successor: Harley Davidson MT500
- Engine: Rotax 348 cc air-cooled single cylinder four-stroke single overhead cam
- Power: 30 bhp (22 kW) @ 8000 RPM
- Torque: 28 N⋅m (21 lbf⋅ft) @ 6500 RPM
- Transmission: "O" ring chain running on hardened steel sprockets
- Wheelbase: 145 centimetres (57 in)
- Dimensions: L: 217 centimetres (85 in); W: 79 centimetres (31 in)
- Weight: 355 pounds (161 kg) (dry)
- Fuel capacity: 13 litres (2.9 imp gal)

The MT350E is a motorcycle introduced in 1993 and manufactured by Harley-Davidson . A development of the Armstrong MT500 it has a smaller capacity engine, electric start and disc brakes.

The Harley Davidson MT350 was primarily used by the British Military Forces and in small numbers by Canada and Jordan.

They were manufactured in York, Pennsylvania, USA between 1993 and 2000.

The MT350 is known for its durability and has seen continued use way beyond its intended service life, with a strong aftermarket for spares and support.

== Users ==
- United Kingdom
- Canada
- Jordan
