= Biker Battleground Phoenix =

- Narrated by: Greg Berger
- Theme music composer: Ride On by Dierks Bentley
- Country of origin: United States
- Original language: English
- No. of seasons: 1

Production
- Executive producers: Bryn Freedman; Mark Rains
- Producers: Ben Wood; David Roma
- Cinematography: Phil Lott
- Editors: Erik Christensen; Jordan Ackerman; Corey Becker; Ben Daughtrey; Tenna Guthrie; Mark Town; Terry Southern
- Running time: 45 minutes
- Production company: Adjacent Productions

Original release
- Network: History
- Release: July 1 – August 26, 2014

Related
- Biker Build-Off

Biker Battleground Phoenix is a scripted reality television series developed for the History Channel. Narrated by Greg Berger, the series pits five rival bike-builders from Phoenix, Arizona, against each other to see who can design and build the best bike to put an end to their rivalry and smack talking. The first episode aired on Thursday, July 1, 2014, at 10:00 pm.

== Premise ==
After legendary bike-designer Paul Yaffe finds out his competition is stealing his ideas and seeing his designs in magazines and his rivals posting them on social media, he decides to answer them by issuing a custom bike-building challenge. He believes the only way to get out of this situation is to challenge his rivals to a "real build" and end this smack talk once and for all. Yaffe says, "Let's compete in our own an old-school of craftsmanship battle of hands and creativity. Five identical bikes, lock yourself in your garage, your tools, your hands, your crew and create what you can." Yaffe contacts his four business enemies and meets them in person at the world-famous Hideaway Grill in Cave Creek, Arizona to discuss the terms before going head-to-head on his bike-build challenge.

Throughout the series, Arizona bike-builders go through numerous challenges, from forging friendships to risking rivalries. Viewers are also given a detailed look at the craftsmanship that goes into making custom Baggers. The Bagger-style motorcycles are cruisers outfitted with saddlebags on their tail which are ideal for touring, hence the name "baggers". The backdrop of Phoenix was chosen because of how well the baggers are represented by the bike shops who produce their own customized cruisers. This signature style of baggers started out there and the local builders set all the latest trends.

Opening Introduction: (narrated by Greg Berger)

Phoenix, Arizona, the biker-building capital of the world. It's the coliseum of custom motorcycles, the biggest battleground there is. Five rivals who fought their way to the top are about to face off: two old enemies, a billionaire outsider, a young gun with everything to prove, and a rebel artist. Blood rivals will battle it out for ego, money and reputation. Five builders pushed to their limits. A season-long battle waged from shops and garages to the giant stages of the biggest bikes shows in the nation, including the epic rally at Sturgis. Now, there's one more battle and this one is personal.

== The Bike Builders ==
- Paul Yaffe – "The Legend" (Paul Yaffe Originals) For the past 30 years, he's dominated the custom-motorcycle scene in Arizona. They call him "The Governor". He made his fame in the 1980s with the Chopper and then later with the Bagger.
- Brian Jenkins – "The Rebel" (Hatred Customs) He builds every one of his custom bikes from scratch from scrap metal parts from the local junkyard in his own garage.
- Kody McNew – "The Young Gun" (VooDooo Bikeworks) He made a name for himself last year by winning awards at Sturgis, the largest bike-building competition in the world, by turning his hobby into an empire overnight with his stylistic bikes.
- John Shope – "The Risk Taker" (Dirty Bird Concepts) Yaffe's number one rival, Shope, has fought his way to the top, and in just eight years, he built a multimillion-dollar empire from the ground up.
- Len Edmondson – "The Outsider" (Azzkikr Customs) Edmondson is a Canadian billionaire who sold his construction company in Vancouver and moved to Phoenix to start his own custom bike business.

== Bike Builder's Throwdown ==
The terms: Five identical stock bikes that each go to a builder's shop with the doors close. The builders can only spend $5,000 on it, and nobody who doesn't work for them can work on the bike. It's whatever they can do to modify that bike as it sits with what they have to work with. And the only one who can fabricate the bike is the owner, however, it's their decision if they want to involve their crews to help. Bottom line - There's a $5,000 limit and the bikes have to be rideable. The timeline is three months.

Yaffe Challenge Rules:

- 6 week build timeframe to complete their bikes
- only current employees can work on the bike (no outside contractors are allowed)
- $5,000 in Harley-Davidson parts (through their sponsoring dealerships)
- $2,000 of their own money to spend on aftermarket accessories

=== Results ===
Builders Vote:
- 1st Place: Len Edmondson
- 2nd Place: Paul Yaffe
- 3rd Place: Brian Jenkins
- 4th Place: Kody McNew
- Disqualified: Jon Shope (for using outside help)

Overall Award: (Judges and Students Choice)

- 1st Place: Paul Yaffe
- 2nd Place: Kody McNew
- 3rd Place: Len Edmondson
- 4th Place: Brian Jenkins
- Disqualified: Jon Shope

== Sturgis Bike Building Contests ==
Full Throttle "Baddest Bagger" Contest:

- "Mike and Angie Ballard" Award (owners of the Full Throttle Saloon: Brian Jenkins)
- "Baddest Biker" Award: Tim McNamer of Ballistic Cycles (for his hubless bagger)

The 26th Annual Rat Hole Custom Bike Show:

"Best of Show" Award: Brian Jenkins

Buffalo Chip "Supreme Sturgis Showdown":

Rules/Judges: Five motorcycle industry experts evaluate the bikes for "form", "fit" and "finish".

=== Results ===
- 1st Place: John Shope - "Chrome King"
- 2nd Place: Paul Yaffe - SRT Bike
- 3rd Place: Kody McNew - Turbine Jet Bike
- 4th Place: Len Edmondson - "Race Star"
- 5th Place: Brian Jenkins - Red Bagger

People's Choice Award: John Shope - "Chrome King"

== Episodes ==
No.	Title	Original release date
1	"Real Throwdown"	July 1, 2014
In the season premiere, master motorcycle builder Paul Yaffe, who specializes in the bagger-style bike is threatened by four of his younger rivals in the Phoenix-area. After finding out some builders are stealing his ideas and his biggest rival, John Shope redesigns a former customer of Yafee's bagger, (2012 Harley-Davidson CVO Road Glide) and shows up to his shop to brag, Yafee wants to put an end to all the smack talk, so he issues an all-out bike building throwdown. Also, rebel bike-builder Brian Jenkins turns a 2013 Harley-Davidson Sportster Seventy-Two into a custom sports bagger for his friend's charity for breast cancer and unveils it at the Dirty Dogg Saloon.
2	"Race to Daytona"	July 8, 2014
Yaffe calls every builder to meet him at Chopper John's to discuss the details of the throwdown. Meanwhile back at the builder's shops, Shope decides to re-design a brand-new 2014 Indian Chieftain, a bike he isn't familiar with, to be the first to mass-produce custom parts. Len Edmondson and Kody McNew both start bike-builds for their debuts at Daytona Bike Week, the second biggest bike-building competition. However, problems arise in each shop with their 2011 Harley-Davidson Road Glides as Len turns his into a 200-horse turbo, while Kody customizes his for a tough customer who demands a deadline. Also, Jenkins turns down a job offer to work as a fabercator in Len's factory.
3	"Risky Business"	July 15, 2014
Four builders take risks while creating innovative baggers. Yaffe is criticized by his rivals that he's lost his edge and comes up with a new concept called "SRT" or "steam roller tour" (220x20 front tire), and agrees to unveil it at Arizona Bike Week. Jenkins has a radical idea to re-engineer the air intake system on a 2012 Harley Road Glide by hiding it on the inside of the bike. Shope gets his prototype Indian parts back from the manufacturers and he's not pleased. Kody must remain calm as he has a falling out with his airbrush artist, Corey St. Clair, but provides a finished product for his customer. Ron's first American-made bagger wins first place at Daytona Bike Week, honoring his son who has bone cancer.
4	"High Stakes"	July 22, 2014
After blowing a delivery deadline before Daytona, Kody has an idea to redeem himself to customize a 2009 Harley Road King on site in 72 hours at Arizona Bike Week. As Shope's Indian parts are on hold, he creates a new bagger for his top client; a 2014 Harley-Davidson Street Glide with a graffiti paint job. Jenkins takes on more than he can handle with a curved seat design on his competition bagger and adding another bike to his workload—a trike for his shop manager who was in a motorcycle accident. Jaffe chooses "Lumilor", an electroluminescent paint for his SRT, but depends on his team when a problem arises with a brake caliper that doesn't fit between the bike's oversized rotor.
5	"Respect"	July 29, 2014
The craziness begins at Arizona Bike Week when Yaffe, Kody and Jenkins all put their businesses on the line in their home state. A nervous Yaffe makes his first stage appearance with his SRT, which is a hit. Even to Shope, who is impressed and jealous as to why he didn't think of a muscle-style bagger himself. Afraid he won't finish his bike in time, Jenkins pulls an over-nighter and it pays off as he wins the "Baddest Bagger" Contest for the second year in a row with his alien-esque bagger. Even though his customer's bagger didn't win, Kody ends the showcase strong by completing his on-premise bike build in 3 days, and presents it to his shop manager and long-time friend, Ricardo in front of a massive crowd.
6	"Big Gamble"	August 5, 2014
Wanting to make an even bigger impression than Yaffe's SRT unveiling, Shope's parts on his new Indian "Tomahawk Series" is ready to be revealed to the masses at the local Westgate Bike Night. Still riding high after winning the "Ultimate Bagger" contest at Daytona, Len decides to build a Cadillac bagger for Sturgis; wanting to win as a U.S. company. Also wanting to compete at Sturgis, Kody aims for originality on his custom bagger with his secret weapon--a JFS 100 gas-turbine starter engine from an F-14. Jenkins buys a $2,000 bagger on Craigslist to customize for his entry into the biggest contest of the year. Later, Shope calls his rivals up on stage to check out his work and gets mixed reviews.
7	"The Build"	August 12, 2014
With the arrival of their donated baggers from Revolution dealerships, Yaffe's Challenge has started. The builders have 6 weeks to complete their bikes for charity. They need to transform stock Harley-Davidson Road Kings from the New Orleans Police Department into customs. Shope is the first to finish in only 3 weeks, creating a "bad-boy" police bike with dual-side exhausts. Kody moves into a bigger shop and designs a "not his style" classic club-bagger. Len moves to a new shop after a lease hike and goes for a Southern California Style, a low-rider bike with smooth sides. Jenkins strips the saddlebags for body side panels. Yaffe stays with his SRT theme, with a rear wheel in the front and an air-ride system.
8	"Judgement Day"	August 19, 2014
The builders finish their bikes just in the nick of time for the Yaffe Challenge and head to the local Motorcycle Mechanics Institute to be judged by the instructors, students and by each other. Shope is disqualified when he admits that he cheated when he sent his bike's engine to be worked on by an outside shop, leaving the four remaining builders in the competition. One week later, the guys work on the final touches of their custom baggers for Sturgis. Shope decides to customize a brand new Indian Chief bagger for Sturgis, while Kody has a major malfunction with his secret jet bike when the F-14 engine catches on fire, forcing him to consider his choice in finishing it for the big contest.
9	"Ultimate Battle: Sturgis"	August 26, 2014
The builders arrive at the Sturgis Motorcycle Rally and get their baggers ready for the "no-rules, no-limits" biggest biker build-off in the country, the "Supreme Sturgis Showdown". It was rough riding for three of them before making the 1,200 mile trip. When a faulty fuel drain line connection is fixed, Kody's jet bike is a go for the Road Iron Bagger Contest, but he bows out after learning Shope is one of the judges. Len fails to get the Cadillac bike done and enters their "Race Star" bike instead. Jenkins is down to the wire with electrical on his red bagger, entering in the "Baddest Bagger" contest. Shope unveils his new Indian bagger while Yaffe reveals his SRT and gets inducted into the Sturgis Motorcycle Hall of Fame.
