= Harley-Davidson VRSC =

Harley-Davidson cruiser motorcycle

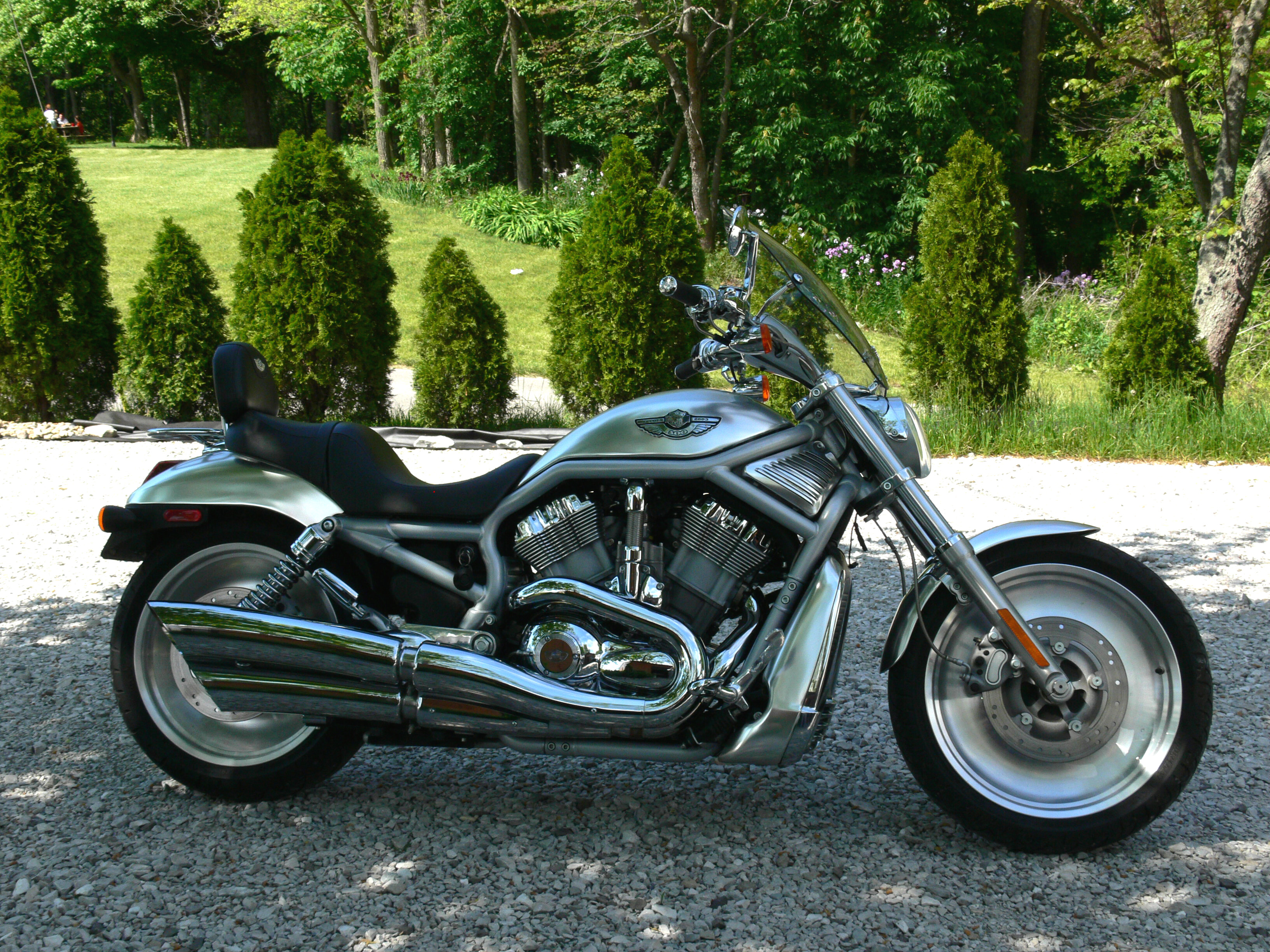
- Manufacturer: Harley-Davidson
- Also called: V-Rod, Night-Rod, Street-Rod, V-Rod Muscle
- Production: 2002–2017
- Class: Muscle bike/Power cruiser
- Engine: 1,131 cc (69.0 cu in) 2002-2007; 1,247 cc (76.1 cu in) 2008-2017 water-cooled 60° V-twin
- Bore / stroke: 100 mm × 72 mm (3.94 in × 2.83 in); 105 mm × 72 mm (4.13 in × 2.83 in)
- Compression ratio: 11.5:1
- Top speed: 137.6–144 mph (221.4–231.7 km/h)
- Power: 115–125 hp (86–93 kW)(2001-2012) (claimed)@ 8,250 rpm 103.2 hp (77.0 kW) (rear wheel)
- Torque: 84.0 lbf⋅ft (113.9 N⋅m) (claimed)@ 7,000 rpm 72 lb⋅ft (98 N⋅m) (rear wheel)
- Transmission: 5-speed, belt drive
- Tires: Front: 120/70ZR-19 60W; Rear: 240/40R-18 79V
- Rake, trail: 34.0°, 5.6 in (140 mm)
- Wheelbase: 67 in (1,700 mm)
- Dimensions: L: 94.4 in (2,400 mm); W: 35.4–37.4 in (899–950 mm); H: 48.2 in (1,220 mm)
- Seat height: 27.1 in (690 mm)
- Weight: 619–677 lb (281–307 kg) (2001-2010) (wet)
- Fuel capacity: 3.2 US gal (12 L; 2.7 imp gal)
- Fuel consumption: Highway: 40 mpg_{‑US} (5.9 L/100 km; 48 mpg_{‑imp}); City: 31 mpg_{‑US} (7.6 L/100 km; 37 mpg_{‑imp})

The Harley-Davidson VRSC (V-twin racing street custom), or V-Rod, is a line of V-twin cruiser motorcycles made by Harley-Davidson from 2002 until 2017. They are often called muscle bikes for their relatively high power output. The V-Rods are the first street motorcycles made by Harley-Davidson with overhead camshafts and liquid cooling.

== Overview ==
The VRSC was introduced in 2001 in a single model called the V-Rod aiming to compete against Japanese and American muscle bikes. The V-Rod's Revolution engine was developed for road use by Harley Davidson engineers with the help from a few Porsche engineers from Harley-Davidson's VR1000 V-twin racing bike engine. A derivative of the Revolution engine called the Revolution X was later used on the entry-level Harley-Davidson Street, first released in 2014.

Unlike other Harley-Davidson production motorcycles, the VRSC's radiator and the hydroformed frame members support the round-topped air cleaner cover. The fuel tank on the V-Rod is located underneath the seat, placing the rider on top of it, rather than the usual frontal placement. The "tank" in this case is actually the cover for the air box and coolant fill port. Loosely based on the VR-1000 Superbike, Harley-Davidson built it as a platform for drag-racing competition machines. All VRSC models were produced at Harley-Davidson's Vehicle and Powertrain Operations facility in Kansas City, Missouri.

== Public reception ==
Car & Driver said Harley-Davidson's branding was "culturally rather than technologically driven; so imagine our surprise at seeing the company's newest ride, the V-Rod, complete with a liquid-cooled DOHC four-valve V-twin developed in partnership with Porsche Engineering." They added, "we think the V-Rod is a serious threat to its own stablemates as well as to cruisers from other manufacturers. It's that good".

Motorcycle Cruiser wrote "The V-Rod was intended to bring in more than the usual suspects, and it did. It became the company's best-selling bike in other countries. In America, V-Rod buyers often came from other brands, attracted by its modern engine, excellent performance and not-the-usual-cruiser style".

== Models ==
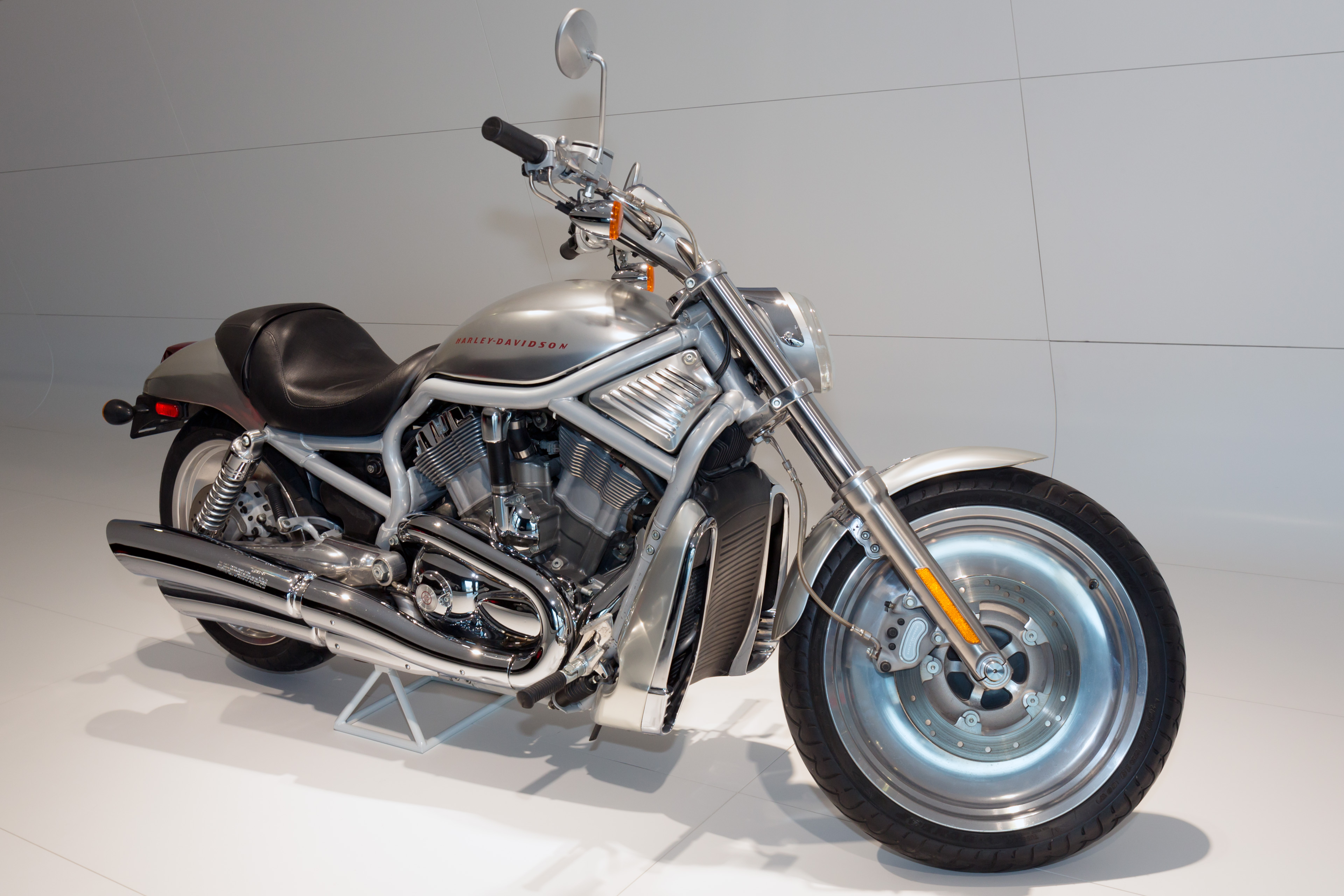
2001 VRSCA V-Rod at Porsche Museum

=== VRSCA V-Rod ===
Model years: 2002–2006.

The original V-Rod had a 1,131 cc (69.0 cu in) Revolution Engine, producing a claimed 115 hp (86 kW) at the crank. The V-Rod had 49 mm forks and a 180 mm rear tire, with solid disc wheels. The VRSCAs were all factory equipped with 3.7 US gal (14 L; 3.1 imp gal) fuel tanks.

2002-2006 models were included in the 100th anniversary edition and some custom builds for special events. Non-standard colour options, wheels and handlebars were amongs mostly modified.

In 2006 the VRSCA was equipped with Brembo brakes. The VRSCA was only offered with forward controls.

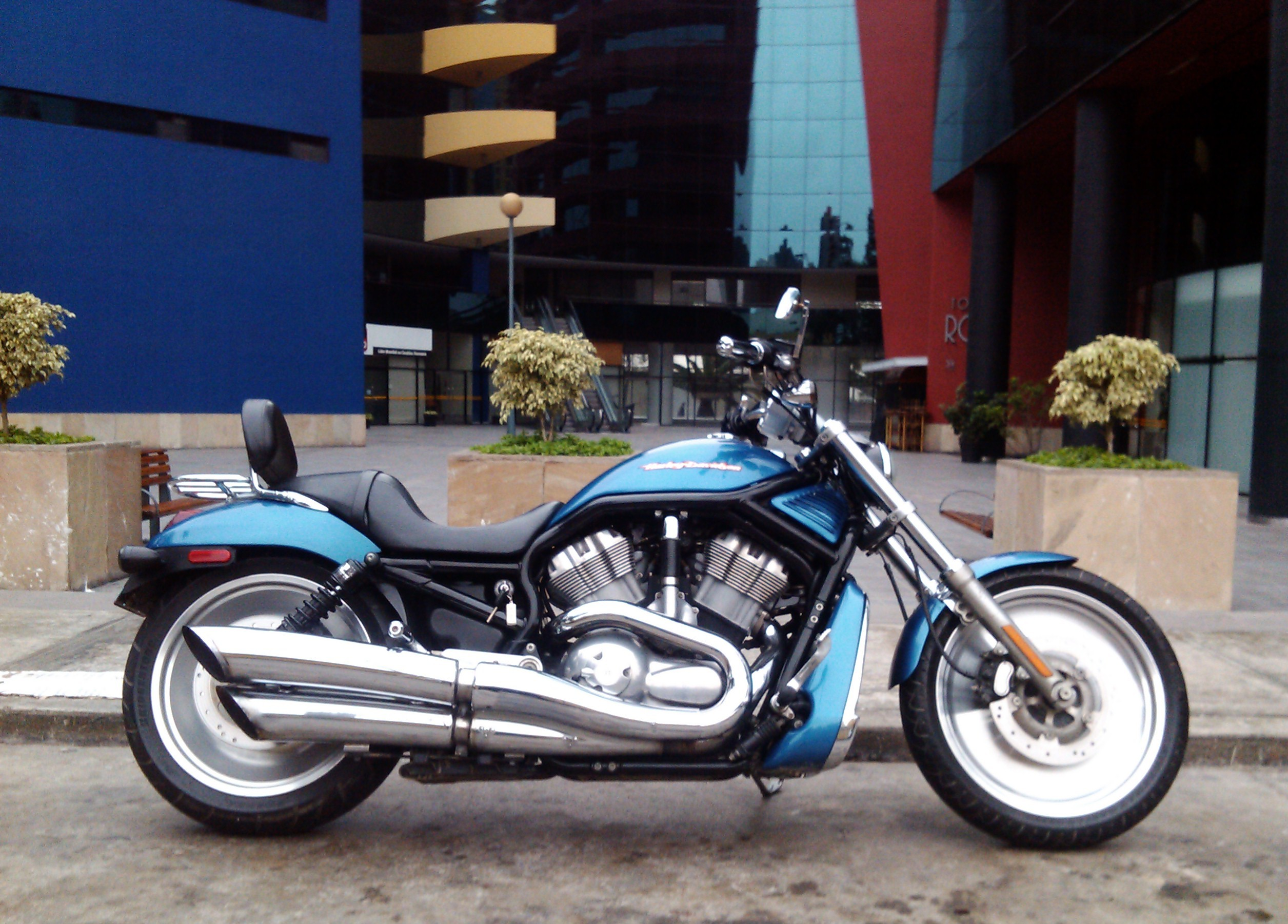
VRSCB V-Rod

=== VRSCB V-Rod ===
Model years: 2004–2005.

The VRSCB V-Rod had a two-year run. It was mechanically identical to the VRSCA, with cosmetic differences including a black frame, polished aluminum and black powder-coated engine, and a slightly different clamshell, instrument housing and handlebars. The VRSCB was only offered with forward controls.

=== VRSCR Street Rod ===
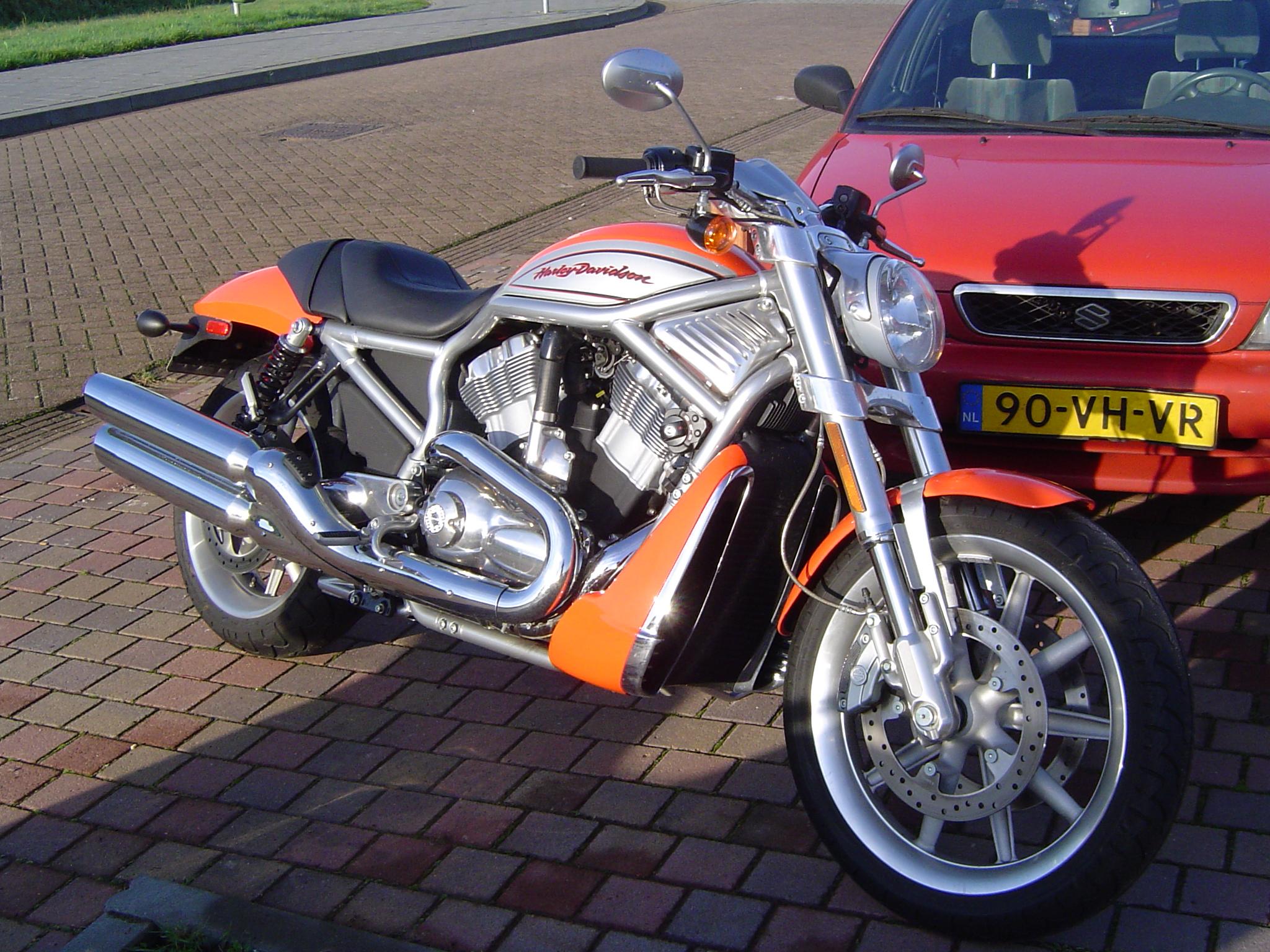
VRSCR Street Rod

Model years: 2006–2007.

The Street Rod was marketed as the “roadster-inspired” member of the VRSC line. The Street Rod was the first VRSC to use inverted forks (made by Showa Corporation) with a steep rake and also was the first to use Brembo brakes. It had the highest seat height at 30 in (760 mm) of any VRSC model, and claimed the greatest lean angle at 40°, over the 32° lean of the other VRSC models. The Street Rod came equipped solely with mid-mounted controls. The Street Rod was the first with a 5 US gallons (4.2 imp gal; 19 L) tank in the 2006 year model, that would become standard for the line in 2007. Of the various versions of the V-Rod, the VRSCR Street Rod roadster was aimed primarily at the European market and was best able to handle the engine's 120 bhp output. MCN wrote: "The Harley-Davidson Street Rod has sharper steering, four-piston brakes made for Harley-Davidson by Brembo, new upswept exhausts for extra ground clearance, and a revised riding position makes this a Harley-Davidson like no other – one that attacks corners with glee".

=== VRSCD Night Rod ===
Model years: 2006–2008.

The Night Rod was introduced in 2006 as the “new hot rod-inspired motorcycle” built around the Revolution engine. The Night Rod has mid controls similar to the 2006 Street Rod. These are the only two V-Rod models with mid controls (Rear sets). Straight-shot mufflers helped the Revolution Engine to produce a claimed 120 hp (89 kW) at the crank. The Night Rod had a black frame, black and chrome engine, Brembo brakes, slotted aluminum disk wheels, and a color-matched fairing. In 2008 the VRSCD Night Rod's Revolution was increased from 1,131 to 1,247 cc (69.0 to 76.1 cu in), producing a claimed 86 lbf⋅ft (117 N⋅m) @ 7,000 rpm, and peak power of 123 hp (92 kW) at the crank, a slipper clutch was also added, as was an ABS option. For the 2008 model year, the VRSCD was the only remaining VRSC model to still have a 180 mm rear tire or mid-pegs. 2008 was also the final year of production for the VRSCD Night Rod.

=== VRSCAW V-Rod ===
Model years: 2007–2010.

The VRSCAW V-Rod is the successor to the VRSCA. First Produced in 2007, it is essentially a VRSCA with a new frame to accommodate the 240 mm rear tire and five gallon gas tank that came standard. The aluminum bodywork of the VRSCA was used in a few early-production VRSCAW models, but was later dropped. With these changes the VRSCAW is a claimed 37 lb (17 kg) heavier than its predecessor. For the first production year the power-plant remained an unchanged 1,130 cc (69 cu in) Revolution engine. The VRSCAW was only offered with forward controls. The combination of increased weight, and a 240 mm rear tire with no power increase made the 2007 VRSCAW the slowest production VRSC produced

In 2008 the VRSCAW V-Rod's Revolution was increased from 1,131 cc to 1,247 cc (76.1 cu in), producing a claimed 84 lbf⋅ft (114 N⋅m) @ 7,000 rpm, and peak power of 123 hp (92 kW) at the crankshaft, a slipper clutch was also added, as was an anti-lock braking system option. For the 2009 model year the VRSCAW replaced the VRSCD, which was dropped from the line, as the "base model" for the VRSC family, and the suggested retail price was reduced.

=== VRSCDX Night Rod Special ===
Model years: 2007–2017.

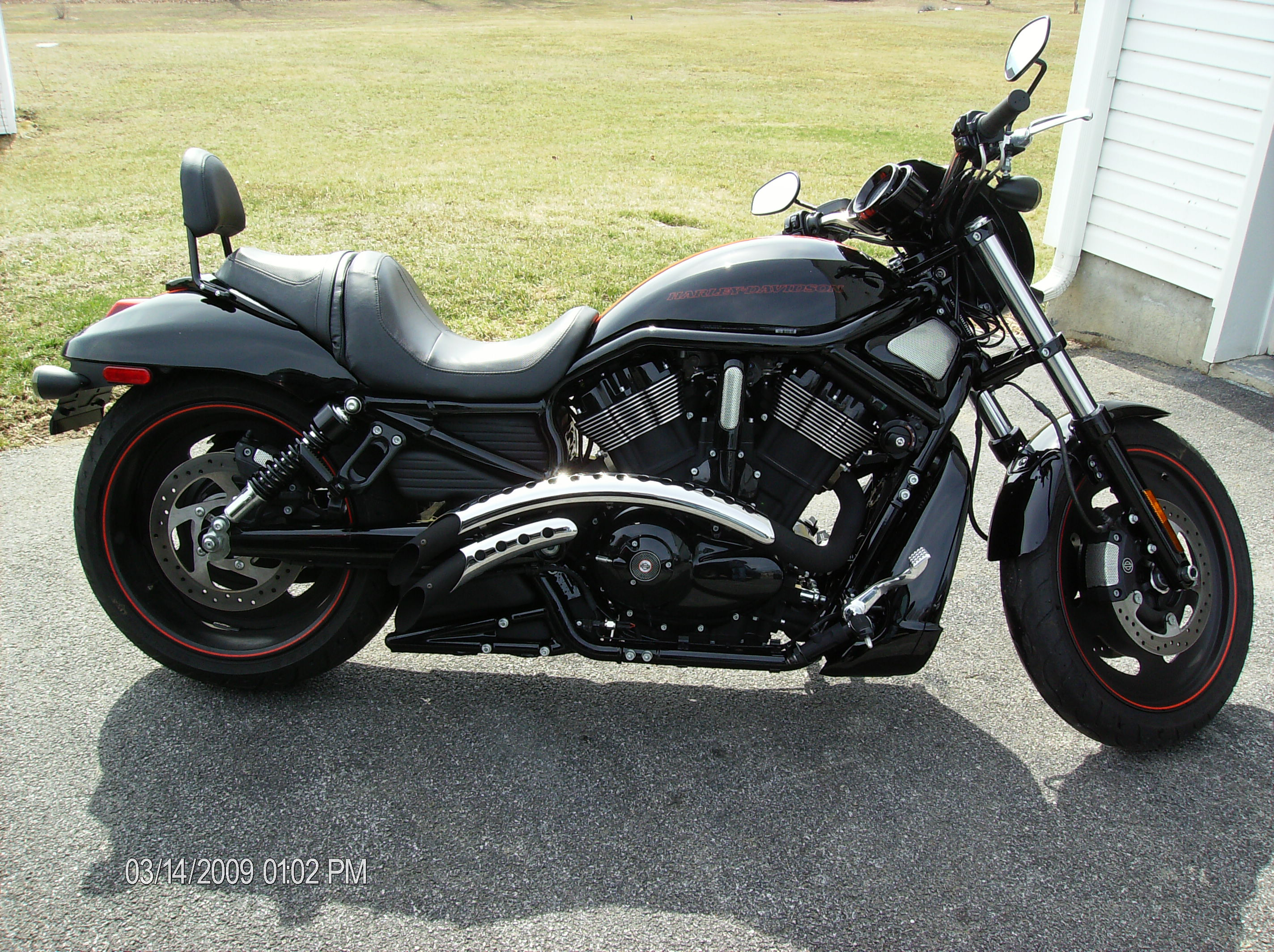
VRSCDX Night Rod Special

The VRSCDX is marketed as the factory made custom version of the standard Night Rod and is also part of Harley-Davidson's "Dark Custom" series. In addition to a 240 mm wide rear tire, most of the chrome components of the VRSCD were replaced with black. The wheels were replaced by black slotted disk wheels, with dark orange pin striping. The Straight shot dual exhaust produced a claimed 120 hp (89 kW) at the crank. A 5-gallon tank was standard. The DX also include racing stripes. In 2008 the VRSCDX Night Rod Special's Revolution was increased from 1,131 to 1,247 cc (69.0 to 76.1 cu in), producing claimed torque of 86 lbf⋅ft (117 N⋅m) @ 7,000 rpm, and peak power of 123 hp (92 kW) at the crank, a slipper-clutch was also added, as was an ABS option. For the 2012 model year, Harley-Davidson launched a tenth anniversary version of the Night Rod Special. This model had a straight-shot exhaust with dual, chrome slash-cut mufflers and chrome exhaust shield; split five-spoke cast aluminum wheels with diamond cut highlights; pullback handlebar with polished finish; inverted front forks in silver and polished finishes; stylized, chrome speed screen visor; graphics, including V-Rod 10th anniversary emblem; and chrome powertrain with platinum crankcase and heads.

=== VRSCF V-Rod Muscle ===
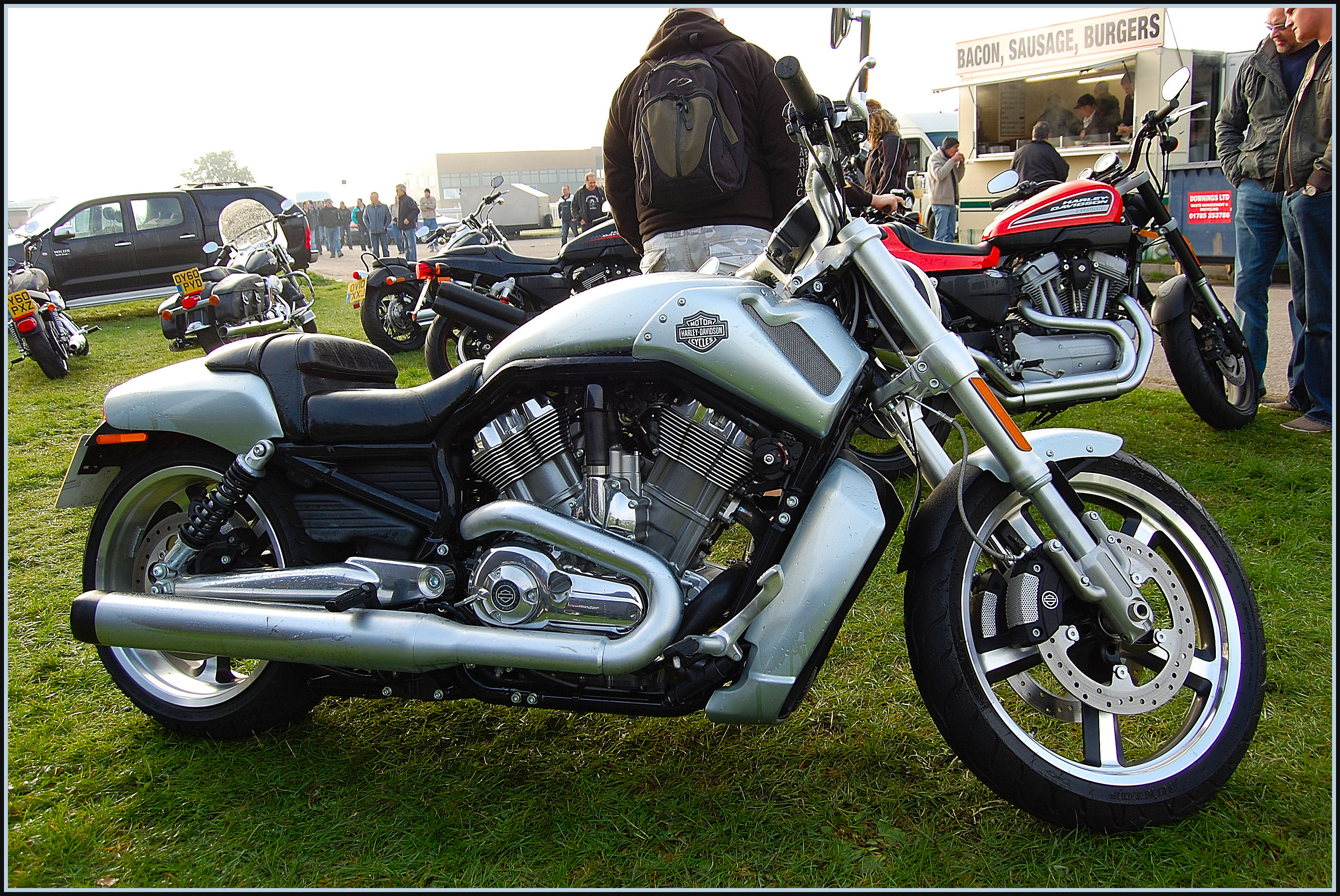
VRSCF V-Rod Muscle

Model years: 2009–2017.

The V-Rod Muscle was introduced in the summer of 2008 at the Harley-Davidson dealer show in Las Vegas for the 2009 production model year. In promoting the Muscle, American fashion model Marisa Miller was hired for an advertising campaign aimed at younger, urban riders. It would be one of only three VRSC models for 2009. Like the other two models, the Muscle used the 1,247 cc (76.1 cu in) Revolution Engine, a 240 mm wide rear tire, 5 US gal (19 L; 4.2 imp gal) fuel tank, slipper clutch and forward controls.

Unlike the other models in the VRSC lineup, the Muscle had straight shot dual exhausts, with a crossover, one on each side of the bike, unlike the 2>1>2 exhaust found on all other VRSC models. Additionally, the Muscle used an air-box with mock-up air-rams like those found on many American pony and muscle cars. In the production version of the bike the air-rams are cosmetic. The VRSCF also had a chopped rear fender with integrated turn signals, and a side-mounted license plate. Turn signals were integrated into the rear view mirrors for the first time as a stock feature on a Harley-Davidson motorcycle. The VRSCF provided at the crank a claimed 86 lbf⋅ft (117 N⋅m) of torque at 6,500 rpm, which was slightly more torque than the other VRSC models, at a slightly lower engine speeds.

Claimed peak crank horsepower was slightly lower than the Night Rod Special, at 122 hp (91 kW) at 500 rpm lower engine speed.

=== VRSCSE Screamin' Eagle CVO V-Rod ===
Model years: 2005.

In 2005 Harley-Davidson's Custom Vehicle Operations produced their first V-Rod. They did not make very many of these. The dimensions were identical to the VRSCA at the time, but the VRSCSE had extra chrome, custom paint, and did not have the typical "clamshell" found on other VRSC models. The VRSCSE had a 1,247 cc Revolution Engine, with CNC ported heads.

=== VRSCSE2 Screamin' Eagle CVO V-Rod ===
Model years: 2006.

The VRSCSE2 was the first V-Rod or VRSC model with a 240 mm rear tire. It also used the Screamin' Eagle 1,247 cc Revolution Engine.

=== VRSCX V-Rod ===
Model years: 2007.

Harley-Davidson put out the VRSCX as a Screamin' Eagle Tribute bike during the Harley-Davidson V-Rod's second consecutive NHRA Championship. The VRSCX had the same dimensions as the 2007 VRSCAW, featuring the 240 mm rear tire, 5 gallon gas tank, and forward controls. However, the VRSCX also had paintwork similar to the pro stock V-Rod, a smoked drag-visor windshield, as well as the 1,247 cc Screamin' Eagle Revolution Engine. 1400 were built.

=== VRXSE V-Rod "Destroyer" ===
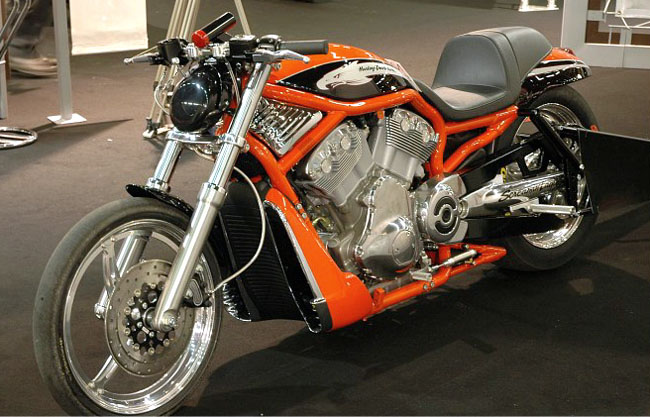
VRXSE V-Rod "Destroyer"

In 2006 Harley-Davidson introduced a drag bike nicknamed "the Destroyer" that was capable of completing a quarter-mile run from a standing start in less than nine seconds, and which was not street legal. Its Revolution engine had a longer-stroke crankshaft and increased bore, high compression forged pistons, larger valves, larger throttle bodies, dyno tuned velocity stacks, and high lift cams. Race-only drivetrain changes included a lightened flywheel, multi-stage lock-up clutch, pneumatic shifter, and programmable shift light. A total of 646 vehicles were produced with 625 released to dealer showrooms. The Destroyer inspired the four-time world champion NHRA Pro Stock motorcycle Harley-Davidson Screamin' Eagle/Vance & Hines V-Rod. The Screamin' Eagle/Vance & Hines V-Rod ran 6.815 seconds and went nearly 200 mph in the quarter-mile.

== The Revolution engine ==
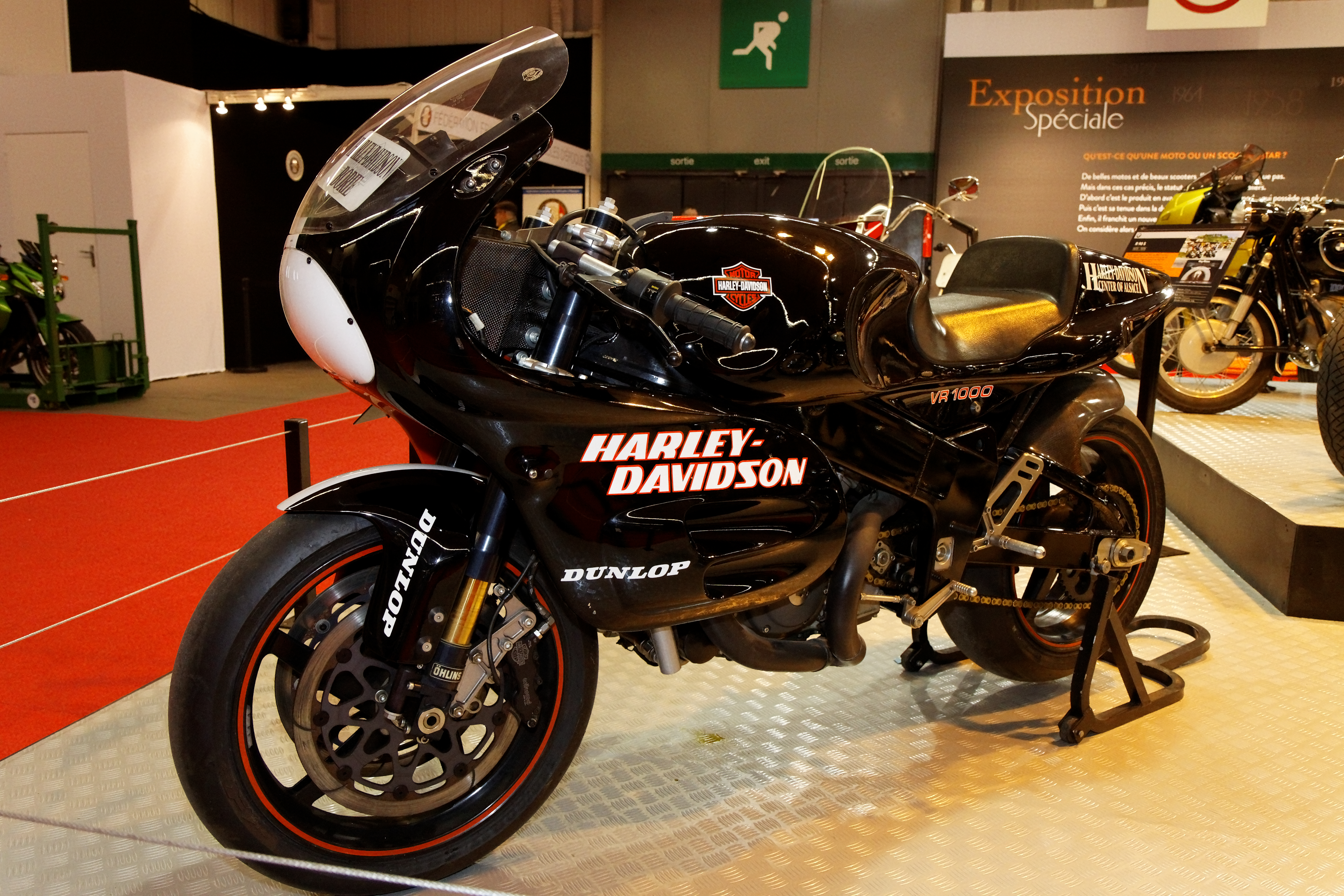
VR-1000 racing superbike

The Revolution engine was developed by Harley Davidson with the aid of a few Porsche engineers from the Harley-Davidson VR-1000 Superbike race engine. Harley-Davidson engineer Mark Miller created the VR-1000 engine with design input from Erik Buell, Cosworth, and Jerry Branch of Branch Flowmetrics; the cylinder head and electronic fuel injection were designed by Roush Industries which also built the series production engines. Harley-Davidson had collaborated with Porsche before, in the Nova project of the 1970s, which, like the V-Rod, was a radical departure from Harley-Davidson's traditional lineup. Nova was cancelled in 1981, in favor of the Evolution engine. The Revolution engine is a liquid-cooled, double overhead camshaft, four valve per cylinder, electronic fuel injected, internally counterbalanced 60 degree V-twin engine with a displacement of 1,131 cc (69.0 cu in), producing a claimed 115 horsepower (86 kW) at 8,250 rpm at the crankshaft, with a redline of 9,000 rpm.

It was introduced for the new V-Rod line in 2001 for the 2002 model year, starting with the single VRSCA (V-Twin Racing Street Custom) model.

A 1,247 cc (76.1 cu in) Screamin' Eagle version of the Revolution engine was made available for 2005, and was present thereafter in a single production model from 2005 to 2007. In 2008, the 1,247 cc Revolution Engine became standard for the entire VRSC line. Harley-Davidson claims 123 horsepower (92 kW) at the crankshaft for the 2008 VRSCAW model. The VRXSE Destroyer is equipped with a stroker (75 mm crank throw) Screamin' Eagle 1,300 cc (79 cu in) Revolution Engine, producing over 165 horsepower (123 kW).

The V-Rod engine was used in the Campagna V13R, and Campagna T-Rex from around 2008 to 2013. There is an agreement to sell the engines to the company for use in the motorized trike. Then in 2013 the company changed the engine in the T-Rex to BMW's K1600 but still uses the V-Rod engine in the V13R.
