= Debi Prasad =

Debi Prasad may refer to:

- Debi Prasad Pal
- Debiprasad Chattopadhyaya
- Debi Prasad Mishra
- Vishal Mourya and Debi Prasad Lenka
- Debi Prasad Roy Chowdhury
- Professor Debi Prasad Chattopadhyaya
- Debi Prasad Sarkar
- Debi Prasad Khaitan, who founded Khaitan & Co
