= CVO =

CVO may refer to:

== Science and technology ==
- Cascades Volcano Observatory, Vancouver, Washington, US
- Chief veterinary officer, the head of a veterinary authority
- Circumventricular organs, positioned around the ventricular system of the brain
- Common velocity obstacle, a type of velocity obstacle
- Covid-Organics, an Artemisia-based drink purported to prevent and cure coronavirus disease 2019

== Other uses ==
- Chief visionary officer, an executive function in a company
- Commander of the Royal Victorian Order, membership of a British order of chivalry
- Corvallis Municipal Airport (IATA airport code), Oregon, US
- CVO: Covert Vampiric Operations, a comic book franchise published by IDW Publishing
- Harley-Davidson CVO, a category of limited-edition Harley-Davidson motorcycles produced by its Custom Vehicle Operations group
- Customer Verified Operation, used in Service Desk operations to note the customer validated the fix put in place by the technician.
