= Khaitan & Co =

Indian law firm

- No. of offices: 6
- No. of lawyers: Approximately 1050+, including 206 Partners and Directors
- Major practice areas: Banking & Finance; Competition Law; Corporate/M&A; Infrastructure & Resources; Intellectual Property; Labour & Employment; Real Estate; Technology; Media & Telecom
- Key people: Haigreve Khaitan
- Date founded: 11 November 1911
- Company type: Partnership / Limited Liability Partnership
- Website: www.khaitanco.com

Khaitan & Co is one of India's oldest full-service law firms. Founded in 1911 by Debi Prasad Khaitan, the firm has locations in Kolkata, New Delhi, Bengaluru, Mumbai, Chennai, and Singapore.

== History ==
Khaitan & Co was founded in 1911 by Late Debi Prasad Khaitan.

The firm has advised clients such as Harley-Davidson India, IGATE, Nippon Life, The Blackstone Group, Vedanta Resources, Hospira, and LiquidHub RPG Group.
