= Harley-Davidson Street =

Motorcycle series manufactured by Harley-Davidson

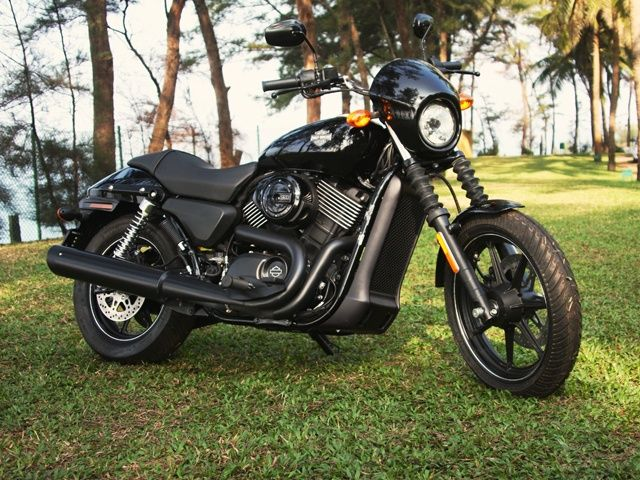
- 2014 Harley-Davidson Street 750
- Manufacturer: Harley-Davidson
- Production: 2014–2021
- Assembly: Kansas City, Missouri, US (US, Canada and Mexico); Bawal, India (rest of world)
- Class: Cruiser
- Engine: 60° SOHC, water-cooled V-twin with balance shaft Street 750:749 cc (45.7 cu in); Street 500: 494 cc (30.1 cu in)
- Bore / stroke: Street 750: 3.35 in × 2.60 in (85.0 mm × 66.0 mm); Street 500: 2.72 in × 2.60 in (69.0 mm × 66.0 mm)
- Compression ratio: Street 750: 10.5:1
- Power: 68.4 hp (51.0 kW) (Street 750) 33.5 hp (25.0 kW) (Street 500)
- Torque: 47.9 lb⋅ft (64.9 N⋅m) @ 4,000 rpm (Street 750); 29.5 lb⋅ft (40.0 N⋅m) @ 4,000rpm (Street 500)
- Transmission: 6 speed, belt drive
- Frame type: Steel
- Suspension: Front: Telescopic forks Rear: Dual shocks, box section swingarm
- Brakes: Front: Single-caliper disc Rear: Single-caliper disc
- Tires: 100/80x17 150/70x15, 140/75R15
- Rake, trail: 32°, 4.5 in (110 mm)
- Wheelbase: 59.5 in (1,511 mm)
- Dimensions: L: 87.6 in (2,226 mm); W: 32.1 in (815 mm); H: 27.9 in (709 mm)
- Seat height: 25 in (640 mm)
- Weight: 480 lb (220 kg) (claimed) (wet)
- Fuel capacity: 3.5 US gal (13 L)
- Related: Harley-Davidson VRSC

The Harley-Davidson Street motorcycle series was announced by Harley-Davidson at the 2013 EICMA show in Milan for 2014 introduction, Harley's first all-new models in 13 years, including Harley's first lightweight motorcycle since the 1974 Sprint. The 750 is powered by a 749 cc displacement version of Harley's 60° SOHC V-twin, water-cooled Revolution engine dubbed the Revolution X. The Street 500 has a 494 cc engine with a smaller bore but is otherwise identical. Production for sale in the United States and Canada is done at Harley's Kansas City facility; production for the rest of the world, including engines, is done at the Harley-Davidson India subsidiary in Bawal with indigenous components. Street series bikes are positioned as Harley's entry-level models, with a price point that is the lowest for Harley's US lineup by over $1,200.

== Harley-Davidson Street Rod ==
For 2017, Harley released the Street Rod based on the 750 Street model. This new model introduced new features such as higher output Revolution X engine 68.4 hp (51.0 kW) @ 8,750 rpm and 47.2 lb⋅ft (64.0 N⋅m) @ 4,000 rpm, 43 mm inverted front forks and piggyback reservoir rear shocks, drag-style bars and 17 inch wheels. The new model, responding to market feedback that demanded a sporty standard, was meant to compete with bikes like the Yamaha FZ-07 and FZ-09.

== Riders Edge Program ==
The Street 500 replaced the Buell Blast in Harley-Davidson's rider training program.

== Reactions ==
Speculation about Harley "outsourcing" production of 500 and 750 cc models (called small-displacement in US press) to India began at least as early as 2011, along with harsh criticism that by not offering smaller bikes there, Harley "doesn't understand emerging markets".

The New York Times also opined that Harley's move towards medium-displacement echoed that of other manufacturers for the developing world.

The midsize is becoming a point of convergence. Commuter motorcycles are getting larger and more complex; from the other direction, Harley-Davidson recently unveiled its lighter Street 500 and Street 750 models.

— Samanth Subramanian, The New York Times, January 3, 2014

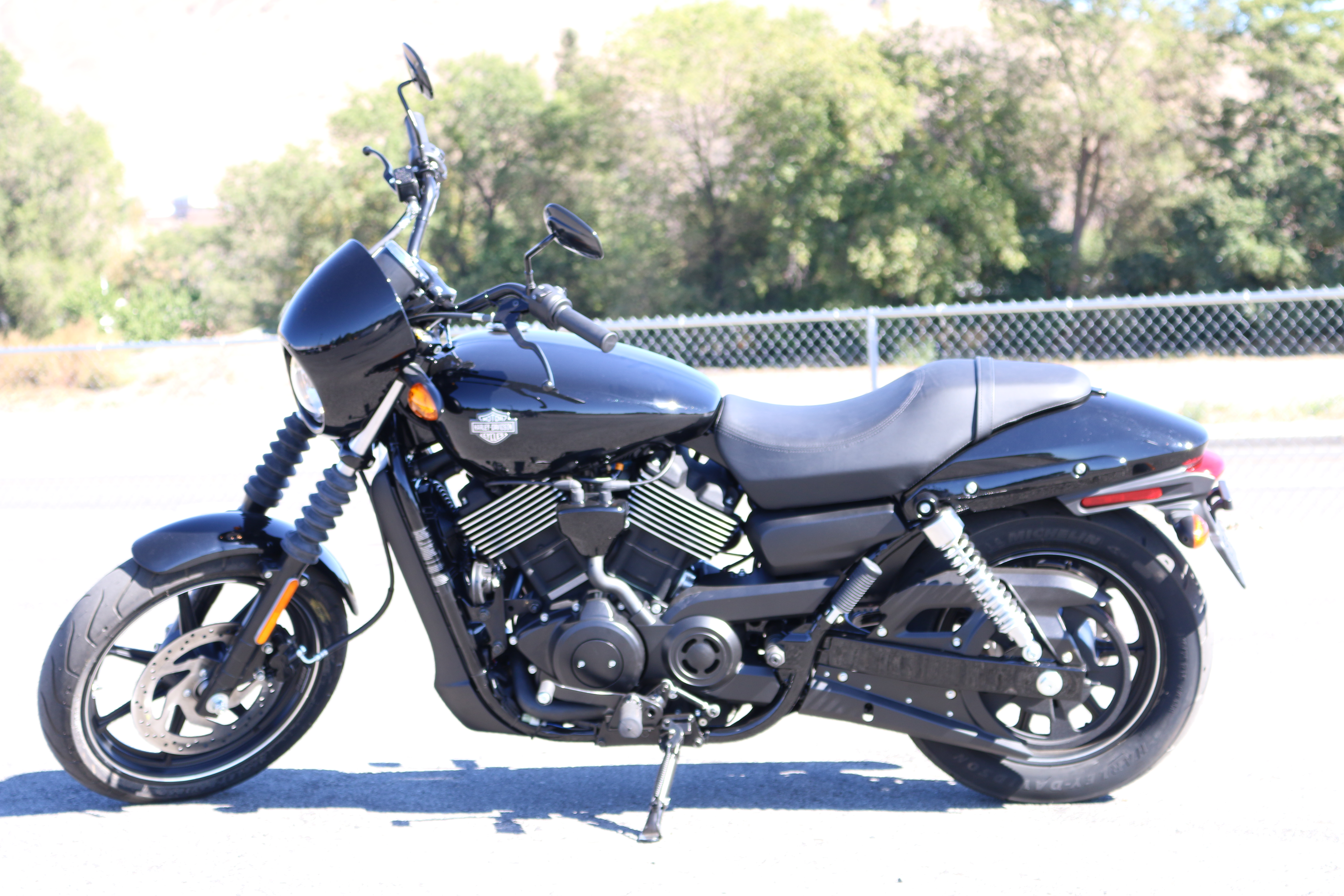
2014 Harley-Davidson Street 750

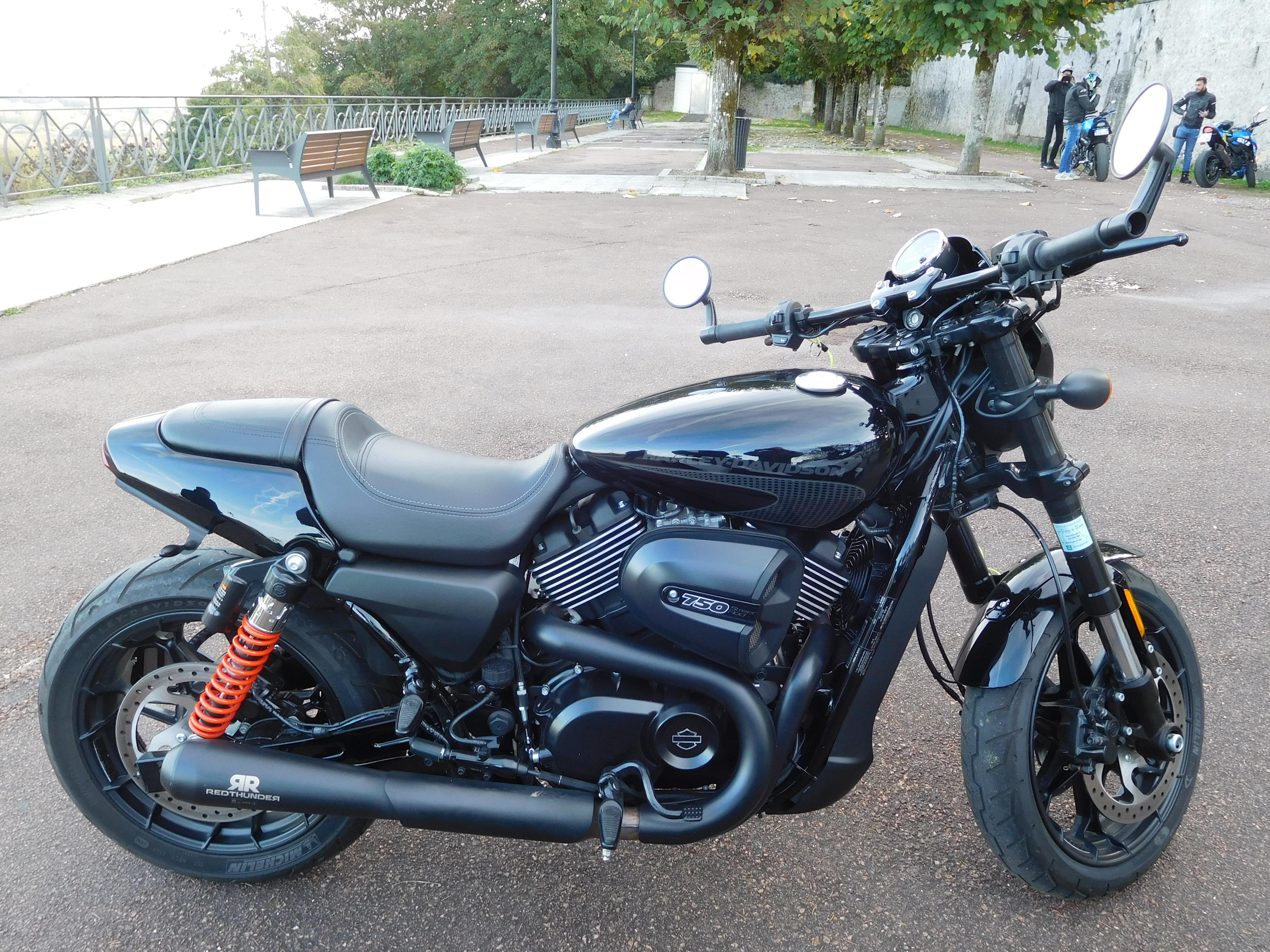
Harley-Davidson Street Rod 750
