= Harley-Davidson India =

Former Indian branch of US motorcycle manufacturer Harley-Davidson

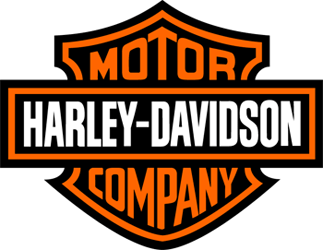
- Type: Subsidiary
- Founded: August 2009; 17 years ago
- Defunct: 24 September 2020; 6 years ago
- Fate: Due to low sales relaunched by collab with Hero MotoCorp
- Headquarters: Gurgaon, Haryana, India
- Products: Motorcycles
- Parent: Harley-Davidson
- Website: harley-davidson.in

Harley-Davidson India was a wholly owned branch of Harley-Davidson, based in Gurgaon, Haryana, India. Harley-Davidson India commenced operations in August 2009 and, in July 2010, appointed its first dealership, which JCBL Group operates.

On 24 September 2020, Harley Davidson announced that it would discontinue its sales and manufacturing operations in India due to weak demand and sales.

== History ==
In 2007, U.S. Trade Representative Susan Schwab and the Minister for Commerce and Industry of India, Kamal Nath, had agreed that Harley-Davidson motorcycles would be allowed access to the Indian market in exchange for the export of Indian mangoes. One Indian commentator called this "mango diplomacy." However, India had not specified emission standards for motorcycles over 500 cc displacement, effectively prohibiting the import of Harley-Davidsons, along with most models of other manufacturers. Plans to export to India were also held up by import duties of 60% and taxes of 30%, which effectively doubled the sale price. A Harley-Davidson spokesman said the company thinks demand is high enough to overcome the tariffs, and (then) chief operating officer Matthew Levatich said they would continue to push for lower tariffs. Levatich has since been promoted to chief executive officer.

In 2009, Harley-Davidson announced plans to establish a subsidiary to be located in Gurgaon, near Delhi. Plans to enter the Indian market were delayed for several years, due to high tariffs and emissions regulations. The pollution regulations have recently changed, but the tariff problem is yet unresolved. Also in 2009, Harley-Davidson India established its annual rock music tour – Harley Rock Riders.

Harley-Davidson announced it was introducing 12 models in India from the range of five motorcycle families, namely Sportster, Dyna, VRSC, Softail and CVO. The motorcycles were completely built units and were to be imported to India, thus attracting a tax over 100% in the price range of 695,000 rupees and 3,495,000 rupees ex-showroom. The bookings were scheduled to start in April 2010 and the motorcycle delivery was to commence in June 2010. To begin with, Harley-Davidson would have five dealerships (Delhi, Mumbai, Bangalore, Hyderabad and Chandigarh) with the aim of increasing the dealerships to more than 20 in the next five years.

The United States ambassador to India, Timothy J. Roemer, attended the opening ceremonies for H-D India's Gurgaon headquarters on 6 May 2010. In November 2010, Harley-Davidson said that it will start an assembly facility for complete knock down (CKD) kits of its motorcycles in India by the first half of 2011, making it only the second CKD facility outside the US.

Anoop Prakash was the company's founding Managing Director.

In 2011, the company set up an assembly unit at Bawal, Haryana. In 2011, Harley-Davidson India began the assembly of its Sportster line followed by the assembly of the Dyna line in 2012 and Softail line in 2013.

In 2014 Harley began production of their Harley-Davidson Street 500 and 750 models in India for domestic sales and export, at Bawal, Haryana India, its only manufacturing facility outside of the US. Also in 2014, the company organized five big rides across the north, south, east and west zones along with the India H.O.G. Rally that takes place every year in Goa.

On 24 September 2020, Harley-Davidson announced that it would discontinue its sales and manufacturing operations in India due to weak demand and sales. The move involves $75 million in restructuring costs, 70 layoffs and the closure of its Bawal plant in northern India.

As of July 2025, some Harley-Davidson products are marketed and sold in India through a collaboration between Hero MotoCorp and Harley-Davidson.

== Products and operations ==
Harley-Davidson offered a range of 11 models in India from each of its six platforms – Sportster, Dyna, Softail, V-Rod, Touring, Street and X440 – in addition to a full range of parts, accessories, and general merchandise, available through authorized dealerships. The company had 29 dealership facilities across India: New Delhi, Gurgaon, Coimbatore, Chandigarh, Mumbai, Hyderabad, Bangalore, Chennai, Ranchi, Kochi, Kolkata, Ahmedabad, Indore, Pune, Goa, Guwahati and Jaipur etc. The Street platform was jointly manufactured at Harley-Davidson's US and India plants. The Street 750 was also exported to Europe and Asia markets from India. Harley-Davidson India also sponsored the country's Harley Owners Group (H.O.G.).
