= Harley-Davidson CVO =

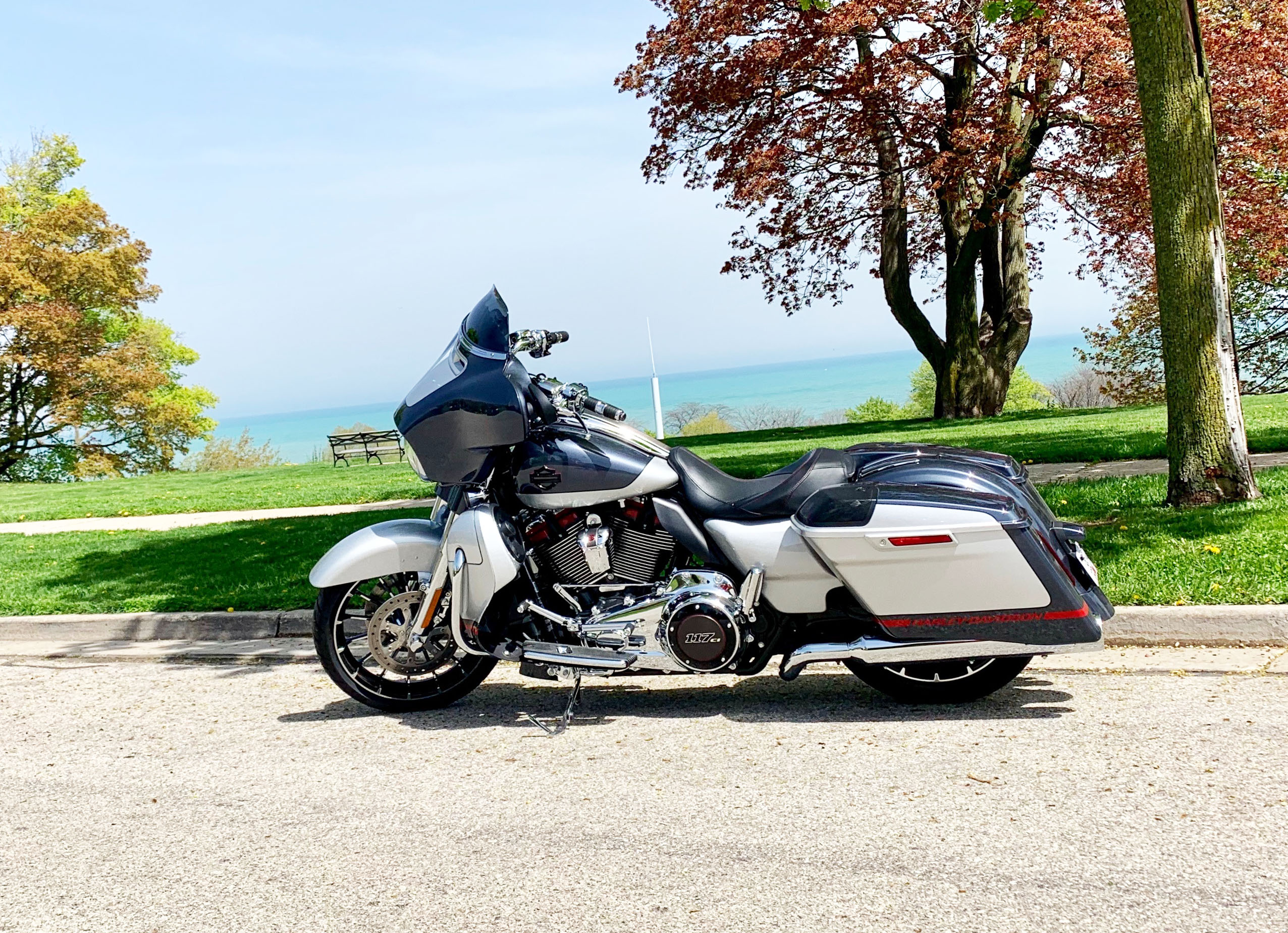
- 2019 Harley Davidson Street Glide CVO Charred Steel & Lightning Silver
- Manufacturer: Harley-Davidson
- Production: Since 2009
- Predecessor: Screamin' Eagle
- Power: 117

Harley-Davidson CVO ("Custom Vehicle Operations") for motorcycles are a family of models created by Harley-Davidson for the factory custom market. For every model year since the program's inception in 1999, Harley-Davidson has chosen a small selection of its mass-produced motorcycle models and created limited-edition customizations of those platforms with larger-displacement engines, costlier paint designs, and additional accessories not found on the mainstream models. Special features for the CVO lineup have included performance upgrades from Harley's "Screamin' Eagle" branded parts, hand-painted pinstripes, ostrich leather on seats and trunks, gold leaf incorporated in the paint, and electronic accessories like GPS navigation systems and iPod music players.

== Design and manufacture ==
CVO models are produced in Harley-Davidson's York, Pennsylvania plant, where touring and Softail models are also manufactured. In each model year, CVO models feature larger-displacement engines than the mainstream models, and these larger-displacement engines make their way into the normal "big twin" line within a few years when CVO models are again upgraded. Accessories created for these customized units are sometimes offered in the Harley-Davidson accessory catalog for all models in later years, but badging and paint are kept exclusively for CVO model owners, and cannot be replaced without providing proof of ownership to the ordering dealer.

== Model history ==
=== 1999 ===
- FXR2 - Based on FXR frame with familiar 80-cubic-inch Evolution motor, added limited-edition billet and chromed components
- FXR3

=== 2000 ===
- FXR4 - Last of the Evolution-powered production motorcycles
- Screamin' Eagle Road Glide FLTRSEI1 - Offered the Twin Cam engine with 95 cubic inch displacement for the first time

=== 2001 ===
- FXDWG2 - Paint was scarlet red with 23 carat gold leaf flames
- Screamin' Eagle Road Glide FLTRSEI2

=== 2002 ===
- FXDWG3
- Screamin' Eagle Road King (FLHRSEI)

=== 2003 ===
- Screamin' Eagle Deuce (FXSTDSE) - First CVO Softail
- Screamin' Eagle Road King (FLHRSEI2) - Introduced the 103-cubic-inch Twin Cam motor

=== 2004 ===
- Screamin' Eagle Deuce (FXSTDSE2) CVO limited blue/black, yellow/silver
- Screamin' Eagle Electra Glide (FLHTCSE) (Blue and black, orange and black)

=== 2005 ===
- Screamin' Eagle Fat Boy (FLSTFSE) - Introduced metal grind accents on the metalwork
- Screamin' Eagle V-Rod (VRSCSE) - First CVO V-Rod
- Screamin' Eagle Electra Glide (FLHTCSE2)

=== 2006 ===
- Screamin' Eagle Fat Boy (FLSTFSE2)
- Screamin' Eagle V-Rod (VRSCSE2)
- Screamin' Eagle V-Rod Destroyer (VRXSE) - customized for performance in drag racing
- Screamin' Eagle Ultra Classic Electra Glide (FLHTCUSE)

=== 2007 ===
2007 CVO models introduced the 110 inch Twin Cam motor in all models (the Softail used the 110B counterbalanced version).

- Screamin' Eagle Dyna (FXDSE)
- Screamin' Eagle Softail Springer (FXSTSSE)
- Screamin' Eagle Road King (FLHRSE3)
- Screamin' Eagle Ultra Classic Electra Glide (FLHTCUSE2)

=== 2008 ===
- Screamin' Eagle Dyna (FXDSE2)
- Screamin' Eagle Softail Springer (FXSTSSE2)
- Screamin' Eagle Road King (FLHRSE4)
- Screamin' Eagle Ultra Classic Electra Glide (FLHTCUSE3)

=== 2009 ===
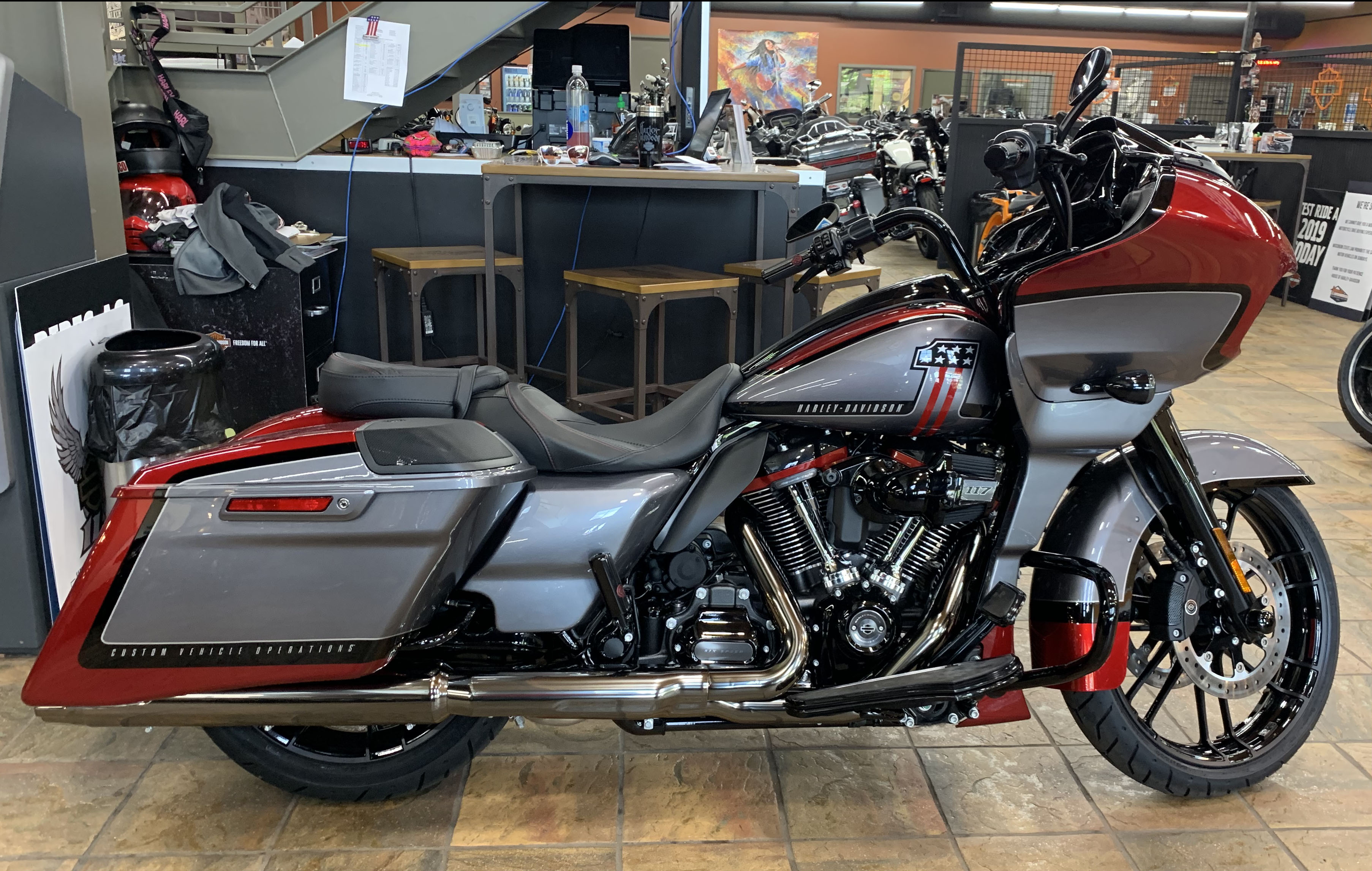
2019 Harley-Davidson CVO Road Glide in Red Pepper & Magnetic Grey With Black Hole

In 2009, Harley-Davidson dropped the "Screamin' Eagle" name from its CVO models and began to refer to them as simply "CVO."

- CVO Dyna Fat Bob (FXDFSE)
- CVO Softail Springer (FXSTSSE3)
- CVO Road Glide (FLTRSE3)
- CVO Ultra Classic Electra Glide (FLHTCUSE4), which retained the Screaming Eagle logo on air cleaner cover and rear panel of trunk.

=== 2010 ===
- CVO Fat Bob (FXDFSE2)
- CVO Softail Convertible (FLSTSE) - Featured removable saddlebags and windshield
- CVO Street Glide (FLHXSE)
- CVO Ultra Classic Electra Glide (FLHTCUSE5)
- CVO Ultra Classic Electra Glide Dark Side Limited Edition - Featured more blacked-out components, only 999 made.

=== 2011 ===
- CVO Softail Convertible (FLSTSE2)
- CVO Street Glide (FLHXSE2)
- CVO Road Glide Ultra (FLTRUSE)
- CVO Ultra Classic Electra Glide (FLHTCUSE6)

=== 2012 ===
- CVO Softail Convertible (FLSTSE3)
- CVO Road Glide Custom (FLTRXSE)
- CVO Street Glide (FLHXSE3)
- CVO Ultra Classic Electra Glide (FLHTCUSE7)

=== 2013 ===
- CVO Breakout (FXSBSE)
- CVO Road King (FLHRSE5)
- CVO Road Glide Custom (FLTRXSE2)
- CVO Ultra Classic Electra Glide (FLHTCUSE8)

=== 2014 ===
- CVO Breakout (FXSBSE)
- CVO Ultra Limited Electra Glide (FLHTKSE)
- CVO Softail Deluxe (FLSTNSE)
- CVO Road King (FLHRSE)

=== 2015 ===
- CVO Softail Deluxe (FLSTNSE)
- CVO Street Glide (FLHXSE)
- CVO Road Glide Ultra (FLTRUSE)
- CVO Limited (FLHTKSE)

=== 2016 ===
- CVO Pro Street Breakout (FXSE)
- CVO Street Glide (FLHXSE)
- CVO Road Glide Ultra (FLTRUSE)
- CVO Ultra Limited (FLHTKSE)
- CVO Dyna LowriderS (FXDLS)

=== 2017 ===
Harley-Davidson Introduced the Milwaukee-Eight 117CI on all CVO models

- CVO Pro Street Breakout (FXSE)
- CVO Street Glide (FLHXSE)
- CVO Ultra Limited (FLHTKSE)

=== 2018 ===
- CVO Street Glide (FLHXSE)
- CVO Road Glide (FLTRXSE)
- CVO Ultra Limited (FLHTKSE)

=== 2019 ===
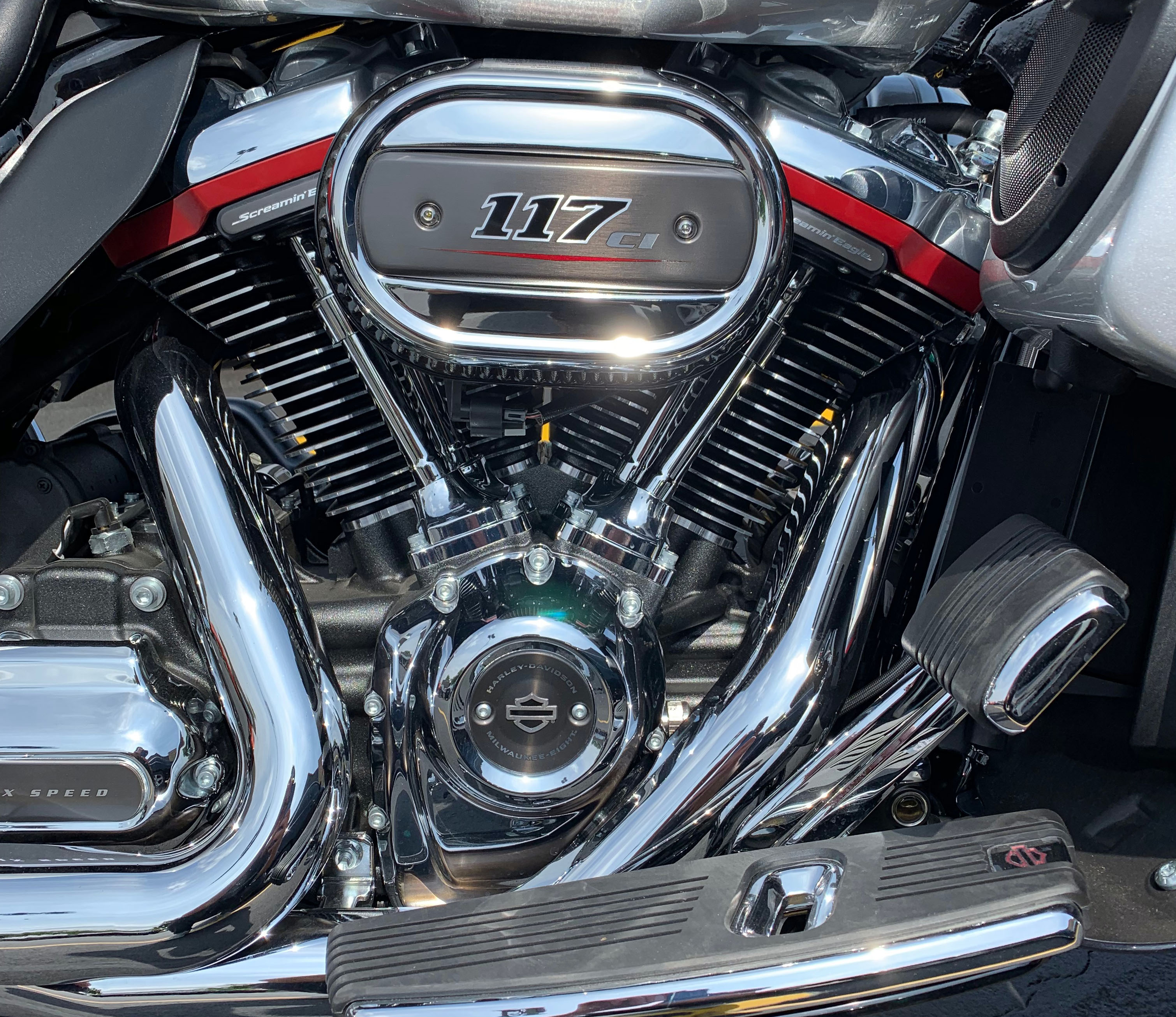
The Milwaukee-Eight engine 117 (2019)

- CVO Street Glide (FLHXSE)
- CVO Road Glide (FLTRXSE)
- CVO Limited (FLHTKSE)

=== 2020 ===
- CVO™ ROAD GLIDE® (FLTRXSE)
- CVO™ TRI GLIDE® (FLHTCUTGSE)
- CVO™ LIMITED (FLHTKSE)
- CVO™ STREET GLIDE® (FLHXSE)
- CVO™ TRI GLIDE

== 2021 ==
- CVO™ Limited
- CVO™ Street Glide
- CVO™ Road Glide
- CVO™ Tri Glide

== 2022 ==
- CVO™ STREET GLIDE
- CVO™ ROAD GLIDE
- CVO™ ROAD GLIDE LIMITED

CVO Tri-Glide

== Critical reception ==
Although CVO models carry a higher manufacturer's suggested retail price than the models from which they are derived and than the competing touring and cruiser motorcycles with which they compete, reviewers generally note that the price is a good value for the customizations they buy:

Depending on the model, a CVO cruiser can easily crest $35,000. But CVO customers willingly accept what otherwise would make many riders spew a mouthful of American pilsner in disbelief the second a CVO’s price tag was revealed. However, the seasoned Harley CVO owner is perhaps wiser than their spendy ways indicate, for hidden in a CVO’s price is surprising value when it comes to a custom-style bike...

— Pete Brissette, http://www.motorcycle.com/manufacturer/harley-davidson/2012-harley-davidson-cvo-models-review-91086.html

The program targets what Harley-Davidson calls its "Alpha Customer," one who is brand loyal and who prides themselves on riding the best The Motor Company has to offer. They're a person who realizes if they went out and sourced a higher performance engine, got their stock bike custom painted, and decked it out in as much chrome as a CVO they'd be footing an even bigger bill than the list price of a CVO.

— Bryan Harley, http://www.motorcycle-usa.com/113/10583/Motorcycle-Article/2012-Harley-Davidson-CVO-First-Rides.aspx
