= Destroyed in Seconds =

American reality TV series

- Presented by: Ron Pitts
- Narrated by: Ron Pitts (Phil Parry UK version)
- Composers: David Vanacore (Vanacore Music)
- Country of origin: United States
- No. of seasons: 2
- No. of episodes: 64

Production
- Running time: 30 minutes
- Production company: Pilgrim Films & Television

Original release
- Network: Discovery Channel
- Release: August 21, 2008 – 2010

Destroyed in Seconds is an American television series that premiered on Discovery Channel on August 21, 2008.

Hosted by Ron Pitts, it features video segments of various things being destroyed fairly quickly (hence, "in seconds") such as planes crashing, explosions, sinkholes, boats crashing, fires, race car incidents, floods, factories, etc. The nature of the show closely resembles Real TV. The show uses real video of real events, and commentary explaining the destruction portrayed. Most videos have stock sound effects added. Some of the events seen resulted in fatalities, and all of the events have property damage.

== Format ==
At the beginning of each episode, a compilation of all the incidents featured in that episode will play (though not in order), with Pitts narrating, "Without so much as a warning, life hangs in the balance. Human endeavor turns to chaos. And within seconds, nothing will ever be the same. Ever." On rare occasions, one incident will be left out of the opening compilation due to restricted space. That was the case for the Wichita City Hall drive-thru, which was not featured in the intro of episode 49. After the compilation, Pitts will describe two of the incidents that happen in the episode in one-liners. Each intro ends off with the phrase, "destroyed in seconds" before the show's main intro plays and the first incident in the episode. For example, episode 45's intro goes like this: "I'm Ron Pitts. Our team leaves no stone upturned in our search for destruction. In Italy, a Le Mans racer comes within inches of another car, as it cartwheels across the track. A military helicopter loses power and slices through the deck of a navy destroyer. A split second is all it takes for things to get destroyed in seconds. "

Each episode usually features eight or nine incidents, with a bonus incident at the end that is not part of the episode, but was lumped in by the crew for fun. The bonus clip usually involves car crashes or military disasters. At the beginning of each video shown, Pitts says the place, sometimes the time and date of the incident. Pitts will then explain the background of the incident (e.g. Racing competitions, industrial disasters), then the moment of the incident and what caused it. In the later episodes of the show, the location is sometimes not stated. This is likely because to give viewers an impression that the incident could have happened anywhere – across the globe or right down the street. Unlike Shockwave and World's Most Amazing Videos, there are no interviewees to talk about what happened in that incident. However, in episode 12, there is an interview with Hank Hogan. The incidents featured in the whole series happened before or during 2009, as the show was cancelled in 2010. At the end of each episode, Pitts ends off with a few words before the credits roll. The end credits usually review all the incidents that happened in the episode in order.

Usually, if a destruction is horrible, very dangerous, heart-stopping, or results in many injuries, the show usually goes into commercial either right at the moment of impact, right before it, or a little afterwards (for example, Jack Bland's brutal crash at Hagerstown in episode 8). When the show starts again, it reviews what happened and then explains what started the incident.

== Episodes ==
Season 1 completed on March 23, 2009, and Season 2 in 2010. This is a list of Destroyed in Seconds episodes for Season 1 and 2:

Episode No.	First broadcast date	Description
01	August 21, 2008	Chesapeake Bay September 30, 1981 – A US Navy Douglas A-4 Skyhawk crashes during a bomb test.; Portland, OR – A father and his son run downhill to escape a mudslide.; Nicaragua November 4, 2002 – Éric Barone tries to set a land speed record on the Cerro Negro volcano. His bike breaks in half when it hits a bump, causing him to tumble down the slope.; Denmark February 22, 2008, A wind turbine subjected to a powerful gale spins uncontrollably until it breaks apart and collapses.; Iran 1980 – Operation Credible Sport ends in a Lockheed C-130 Hercules crash.; Parkersburg, Iowa May 22, 2008 – A tornado hits a bank.; Leighton, Alabama – Cars are sent into the air by a tornado that hits a parking lot.; Milwaukee, Wisconsin April 11, 1989 – A Sikorsky S-58ET N4247U (November 4247 Uniform) operated by Midwest Helicopters crashes due to a failed coupling on the tail rotor, after carrying an old and faulty air conditioner from a roof.; Bristol, VA April 15, 2008 – A tanker truck fire is caught on tape by a police dashboard camera.
02	August 21, 2008	Bakersfield, CA – Speedboat racer Gary Ewing hits the shore, flies over a hill, and onto a road. He escapes just before the boat hits land.; Puget Sound, WA July 11, 1940 – Footage of the Tacoma Narrows Bridge collapsing, killing a dog.; Thorold, Ontario August 11, 2001 – MS Windoc crashes into a canal bridge, and catches fire, leading to an explosion. Thankfully, no one is killed.; Okinawa, Japan August 20, 2007 – China Airlines Flight 120 catches fire on the tarmac and has to be evacuated. Everyone makes it off the plane before it is destroyed by the fire.; Zambramnya, Iraq – An Al-Qaeda torture compound is blown up by a US missile strike.; Guam – A B-2 Bomber crashes on takeoff and is destroyed.; Texas – A tornado rips the entire foundation off a house, like The Wizard of Oz; and has damaging hail. The next season, Stormchaser Alex Tyler builds screens for his car to protect his team from hail, but an F5 tornado drops softball-sized hail on them. A downed power line traps him with the tornado closing in, but he is able to escape. Despite all the protections, it still almost breaks the windows.; Kırıkkale, Turkey August 29, 1997 – A munitions factory is blown up by terrorists and is completely leveled.
03	August 28, 2008	Oxnard, CA February 14, 2005 – An Amtrak Pacific Surfliner train hits an 18-wheeler because of a faulty traffic signal.; Bucheon (misreported as Iksan, which suffered a similar accident less than a month later), South Korea – A fire starts at a propane filling station, leading to one of the largest BLEVE's in history.; Mountain Home, ID September 14, 2003 – Thunderbirds pilot Chris Strickland crashes at an airshow, evading death by ejecting 1/8 of a second before his plane hits the ground and explodes.; Middle River, MD September 14, 1997 – A F-117 Nighthawk crashes into an empty house after part of the wing breaks off.; Henderson, NV May 4, 1988 – The PEPCON disaster.; Manila, Philippines – An 8-story department-store comes off its foundations, and crashes into a nearby high-rise flat, but no one is killed.; Chouteau, Oklahoma; San Diego, California – David Ferguson crashes his speedboat twice.; St George, Utah 1/05 – The Santa Clara River overflows, and destroys several houses.
04	September 4, 2008	Taiwan July 8, 1995 – A tanker truck carrying styrene explodes.; Cape Canaveral, FL 1/17/97– A Delta II 7925 explodes because of a 19-foot-long crack.; Thailand – A 40" mock cigarette made from hydrogen-filled balloons at a mock funeral on World No Tobacco Day goes up in flames.; Kyrgyzstan, Central Asia August 8, 2005 – A climbing expedition's helicopter crashes into the ice from engine problems.; Moreton Island, Queensland November 8, 1997 – The Enterprise freighter is sunk to make a reef by blowing out the hull, but causes injuries after they use too much explosives.; Fullerton, CA – The Air Day plane crash.; Assisi, Italy September 26, 1997 – An earthquake destroys St. Francis Church.; Oklahoma – A tornado devastates most of a pig farm's buildings. Two years earlier in Oklahoma, a smaller tornado hits the El Reno airport.; Hawaii September 11, 1992 – Hurricane Iniki.
05	September 18, 2008	Dallas, TX – An acetylene factory fire launches tanks onto the road.; Prince George, British Columbia – At the Sandblast Games downhill race, a couch crashes with 3 people. The crash ends the Sandblast Games.; New Providence, IA – A new water tower collapses.; Murdock, IL September 3, 1983 – A railway car with gas derails and burns for 3 days, causing two massive explosions.; Phoenix, Arizona – Stolen dump truck chase, ending in a crash.; Wailua, HI – A helicopter crashes on a ditch. Tiny Everal manages to lift the helicopter off pilot Steve Kux, saving him.; Mexico City, Mexico – A tanker truck explodes after hitting a train.; Mojave Desert July 12, 1998 – Ron Cook tries to set a speed record on his motorcycle and wipes out, but survives the 200 mph crash.; Nagasaki, Japan – A typhoon blows a building past a hotel where a travelling English folk-dance team is staying.
06	September 25, 2008	Amsterdam, New York April 27, 2002 – The local fire department set a derelict wooden house on fire for a training exercise, only for the structure to explode violently due to the fuel having soaked into the wood.; Weatherford, TX October 8, 2005 – A Police chase ends in a 120 mph head-on crash.; Plymouth, England – The King of Shaves speedboat crashes.; Three Rivers, TX August 25, 1990 – Gas dire tank explosion.; Tainan, Taiwan – A rescue-training helicopter crashes into water during a rescue training exercise.; Old Dalby, England July 17, 1984 – To test the structural integrity of a nuclear flask, a train is crashed into it and explodes; the flask is undamaged, making the experiment a success.; La Paz, Bolivia – Domestic disturbance call with a rigged propane trap that blows the house up around police.; England 1998 – A fireworks factory catches on fire and fireworks shoot out. No one was injured.; Sevastopol, Ukraine July 10, 2006 – Tupolev Tu-134 05 runs off the runway and crashes on takeoff due to a flock of birds that caused a bird ingestion to an engine.
07	October 2, 2008	UK July 24, 1993 – At an airshow a pair of MiG-29s collide at the Royal International Air Tattoo. Both pilots eject and land safely.; Chandler, AZ February 24, 1985 – Speedboat racer Sonny Moon jumps out just before his boat crashes into the shore and flies onto powerlines.; Manchester, England June 15, 1996 – 1996 Manchester bombing a van loaded with 3,300 pounds of explosives is detonated at the Arndale centre in the center of town by the Irish Republican Army.; Florence, OR November 12, 1970 – Paul Linman reports on the blowing up of a whale carcass, but the explosives end up flinging huge pieces of whale inland, even crushing a parked vehicle that no one was in at the time. They are ultimately forced to go with Plan B: move the whale into a trench.; St. Paul, MN – I-94 van fire BLEVE explosion fireballs across traffic.; Caruso Gorge, CA – Miles Todd mountain bikes and falls 150 feet down a cliff, resulting in serious injuries.; NASA 1984 – Boeing airplane crash test.; Las Vegas, NV January 1, 1968 – Evel Knievel's fountain crash. Wembley, England – Evel Knievel's 13-bus jump crash.; Albuquerque, NM – A hot air balloon in the shape of Smokey Bear hits a radio tower trapping the pilot and two boys.
08	October 9, 2008	Addis Ababa, Ethiopia April 6, 1991 – terrorists blow up an ammo depot killing over 100 with several explosions.; Hagerstown, MD – during a race Jack Bland is bumped into a corner guard rail and badly wrecked.; Paris, France – June 8, 1989, airshow Russian MIG crash Paris Air Show.; San Francisco, CA December 12, 1995 – a mansion is swallowed up by a sinkhole caused by a sewer break.; Wilkesboro, NC – an SUV crashes through a diner knocking a man into the counter.; Granby, CO June 4, 2004 – Marvin Heemeyer in the Killdozer.; TX May 5, 2000 – a cop pulls over a woman and warns her to stand back so she doesn't get hit, then her car gets hit with a van which seemingly defies the laws of physics by not flipping over.; Texas City, TX April 16, 1947 – The Texas City Disaster.
09	October 16, 2008	Fairfield, UT – a British helicopter does a loop at an airshow and crashes.; Swedish Air Force February 2, 1989, Test pilot Lars Radestrom crashes a Saab JAS 39 Gripen test flight on landing and rolls. Four years later in Stockholm August 8, 1993, Lars is at an airshow in another Saab 39 Gripen and it stalls, crashes and explodes. Lars decides to retire.; Dakota Co. MN July 11, 2008 – a cop stops a mini van, suspecting the driver of drinking and driving simultaneously, and an SUV, carrying the real drunk driver, smashes into it and flips over.; Sacramento, CA – during a jet car race Dennis Geisler's chute fails to open, he crashes and explodes in front of Neil Hanson. He was in recovery for 2 years, and abandons his jet car race career.; Perris, CA 1983 – skydivers try to set a record and their DC3 catches fire on takeoff.; Marshall Islands 1954 – Castle Bravo atomic bomb test explosion is 62 miles wide and leaves a 1.2-mile crater, larger than expected and destroys the testing facility.; Comoros Islands 11/23/96– a hijacked Ethiopian plane crashes into the ocean next to a resort, killing 125.; Kīlauea, HI 1986 – a lava flow takes out the town.
10	October 23, 2008	Kolding, Denmark November 3, 2004 – Seest fireworks disaster.; International Hot Boat Race – Dave Promnitz crashes.; Norway – Hans Lange jumps from a cliff in a wingsuit and gets stuck 20 feet up in a tree.; Milwaukee, WI – Brewer's Stadium crane collapses while building a new roof, killing 3 and construction is delayed a year.; Morrisburg, Ontario September 25, 1976 – Ken Carter rocket car jump.; Poland – a dance troupe's tour bus is hit by an F1 tornado.; Albuquerque, NM October 8, 1984 – hot air balloon hits powerlines and explodes, sending the basket along with the pilot and passenger to the ground.; Guam 8/92 – Typhoon Omar. Storm chasers Jim Leonard and Barbra White film as part of a roof flies through powerlines. Then the wooden frame of a roof misses hitting them.
11	October 30, 2008	San Diego, CA May 17, 1995 – Shawn Nelson's road rampage with a 57-tonne M60 Patton tank.; Gërdec, Albania – 90,000 tons of ammunition explode causing chaos.; Melbourne, Victoria – Keith Agius' funny car burst into flames and crashes into Darren Carter.; Lakehurst, NJ – The 1937 Hindenburg disaster and the Heliostat crash.; Mexico – Actor Andres Garcia flies in a helicopter for scene in a soap opera involving the helicopter towing a boat. The towline snaps and the helicopter crashes into the water. Andres and the pilot are soon rescued.; Taiwan March 31, 2002 – two cranes fall 56 stories from Taipei 101 during an earthquake (331 Earthquake).; Imperial Sand Dunes, CA – Trevor Thomas does a double jump with his quad ATV and crashes into another ATV.; Salinas, CA October 3, 1999 – Wayne Handley crashes his Turbo Raven plane into the ground at an airshow.
12	November 6, 2008	Sewan River, FL – Hank Hogan wipes out his speedboat at 140 mph and is thrown across the water.; Russia October 5, 1991 – a Soviet Yakovlev Yak-141 fighter prototype plane explodes when landing on a carrier. A year later in Russia, two Russian Yakovlev Yak-38 VTOL fighters hover over a runway and 1 crashes.; Salt Lake City, UT December 13, 2003 – a van hits ice and crashes into the median, a band coming in the other direction crashes into it and their equipment goes flying.; Dnipro, Ukraine – a sinkhole eats 144 apartments.; Pontiac Lake, MI – a plane crashes into a lake and fishermen rescue the passengers.; Jacksonville, FL 2007 – T2 Laboratories explodes in a massive fireball.; Lake Michigan – during a search, a boat not looking crashes into a Coast Guard Cutter and after the occupants have no idea what happened.; Antelope Valley, CA January 19, 1995 – NASA Rockwell-MBB X-31 goes out of control and crashes.
13	December 11, 2008	Santiago, Chile – An industrial plastics factory fire spews shrapnel and toxic smoke.; Ridger Mountain Range, MT – Nick Baldwin & Mike Nugent film their skiing for a movie and accidentally start an avalanche that buries them. Mike is thrown into some trees which breaks his hip and femur, while Nick protects himself from the avalanvhe by holding on to a tree near him; Isle of Man – The 2003 Isle of Man TT. Richard "Milky" Quayle smashes into a wall at 160 mph and survives.; St. Petersburg, Russia – 9-story apartment building fire and building collapse.; Phoenix, AZ – Kevin Eldridge bails out of his burning Corsair during a race. As his bails out, he's hit by the plane's horizontal stabilizer, breaking his right arm and a vertebra in his neck.; Los Angeles – Southern I-405 A chain of accidents filmed by Paul Anderic.; Cape Canaveral, FL August 12, 1998 – Titan IV rocket goes off course and is blown up.; Arches National Park, UT – SUV coming down Lion's Back rock with newlywed couple Shawn and Tina Hasty crashes off the side.; Nantucket Island 12/92 – A Nor'easter storm rips a house away.
14	December 18, 2008	Calder Park Raceway, Melbourne, Victoria, Australia – Graeme O'Brien's stock car crashes and flips 14 times.; British Columbia, Canada – Big Dawg Shootout snowmobile hill climb Tim McGregor's crash.; Oleiros, Spain – Virgin Mary Festival launches a paper balloon that catches fire.; Blue Hill, NE – during a high school football game a gyroplane crashes into bystanders.; Oklahoma City, OK March 21, 2002 – Fire at a motel. The burning roof collapses and nearly buries several firefighters. One is missing, but is found after falling into an open room; Sacramento, CA – DJ Reed's 68 Camaro is driven by his friend Greg into a wall at 100 mph.; Fort Hall, ID October 4, 2005 – cops set up spike strips and a fleeing van crashes into a police car trying to evade the spikes.; Belfast, Northern Ireland September 6, 1986 – 70-year-old pilot Ken Wallis crashes a gyrocopter.; Kingsbury County, SD 6/03 – Reed Timmer and friends film an F4 tornado forming. They get dangerously close, and one of the guys panics. Then, the tornado changes direction and heads straight for the team. They desperately back up and watch as the tornado destroys homes with its 260 mph winds.
15	January 5, 2009	Chicago, IL – a 110-car freight train smashes into an 18-wheeler.; Del Mar, CA July 4, 2001 – Bubba Blackwell motorcycle jump ends badly.; Bakersfield, CA – Bill Burch 1941 drag race crash. He loses control, hits the wall and flips 15 times.; Paris, TX – Part of a four-story furniture warehouse collapses in a fire, then explodes.; Mount Hood, OR – a helicopter crashes on a mountain top after rescuing trapped climbers.; Surat, India – a large building falls off its foundation into the street.; Maple Heights, OH – methane gas line explodes into a fire.; Wentworth Valley, Nova Scotia 1/94 – the Dix house belonging to Ed and June Dix is carried off in an ice flood and crashes into the Wallace bridge.; Wilmington, NC – a crew putting up a civil war monument tips their crane over into powerlines.
16	January 12, 2009	Mexico – Baja 500 run – saboteurs make a hole in the course and a white truck hits it and is launched and flips. Then a Landover hits the same trap and also flips.; Denver, CO – window-washing platform smashes into a building, breaks, and strands 2 men who have to be rescued by firemen.; Huntington Beach, CA – Paul "Flush" Fernandez gets pulled by a van while on a bike to take a ramp jump onto the roof of a house and hits the side of it.; Florida August 13, 2004 – Hurricane Charley hits Punta Gorda.; Schenectady, NY Airshow August 4, 1991 – Canadian Sea King shopper crashes.; France – Explosions follow a commuter train's crash into a propane truck.; Chicago, IL – black ice causes an accident and a police car on scene is smashed by a DWI driver.; Rockford, IL – trailer crash racing.
17	January 26, 2009	St. Augustine, FL – A jet dryer catches fire and exposes firemen to a barrage of devastating explosions.; Buffalo Grove, IL – An elderly man is pulled over by a cop for speeding. After some negotiations, the man is given the all-clear. He hops back in his car, only to accidentally reverse into the police car.; Willowbank Raceway, Queensland, Australia – Phil Lamattina's top fuel dragster is going at full throttle. Suddenly, it snaps in half, then tumbles down the track in flames.; Belfast, Northern Ireland – A Harland and Wolff tower crane's boom is clipped by the gantry crane Samson. The tower crane topples, narrowly missing workers.; Daegu, South Korea – A truck carrying warheads catches fire in a tunnel. Everyone evacuates. The warheads don't explode, but the truck's fuel tank does and sends cars sliding down the tunnel due to the explosive force.; Hagerstown, Maryland – Jake Johnson wipes out during a Harley Davidson motorcycle race, then Brian Smith crashes into the wrecked bike and goes flying as his bike snaps in two. Jake's not hurt, while Brian breaks his forearm.; Gulf of Tonkin – The 1967 USS Forrestal fire. When an electrical fault launches a Zuni rocket into a jet, an explosion engulfs the carrier. Military personnel struggle to put the fire out, and one after another planes and warheads explode causing a massive chain-reaction. Burning debris rains down on soldiers causing mass panic. One hundred and thirty-four are killed.; Lowestoft, England – During an airshow, a Harrier jump jet loses power and the pilot ejects seconds before it slams into the sea. He breaks his ankle, after landing onto the wreckage.; Odda, Norway 1993 – A historic village is buried by an avalanche. It topples a house, and one person is killed.
18	January 26, 2009	Las Vegas, NV – At Pro Flame, a propane plant truck unloading starts a fire, then the fire spreads to the neighboring Amerigas plant. Explosions semd fire 150 feet in the air. The fire burns for 21 hours, the tanks blew everywhere and caused $4–5 million in damage.; Woodward, IA November 12, 2005 – A man films an F2 tornado coming right at his house, it hits his neighbor's house, goes by his house and takes out the house behind him. They run over and a woman and her dog are inside and need help.; Hollister, CA – Paul Hepworth and his friends go onroading and up Truck Hill. Halfway up he loses control, goes backwards and flips over 3 times. His friends think he's dead, but all 4 of them are able to walk out. Paul's $7,000 truck is a total loss.; Burke County, NC July 24, 1998 – A huge traffic jam causes cars to use an on ramp to get off the highway. A tanker truck hits a bridge, catches fire and the steel bridge collapses on the truck, which explodes, killing the driver. But no other motorists are injured.; Marble Falls, TX – Lakefest Nationals dragboat racing. Todd Haas wins the race, then loses control, flips over, bounces and shreds apart. He is fished out of the capsule and is OK.; Moscow, Russia 2005 – In the Lefortovo Tunnel under the river, there is ice from a ceiling leak that causes numerous accidents. A jointed bus wipes out, fishtails and hits the wall. A blue car hits the wall and flips over, then a box truck smashes into another box truck that seemingly appears out of nowhere.; Twin Falls, ID 7/99 – "Flying" Mike Brown (36) does a jump over flatbed trailers in grass when he loses traction and hits the ramp, but doesn't make it and goes off his bike and under the bottom trailer. He's is in a coma for 5 weeks and retires from jumping.; San Francisco, Ca – The fishing boat Contender takes on water and starts sinking. The boat is full of people hanging on to the last second as boats come to rescue them. One by one, the 28 passengers and crew leap into the water. It is 50 °F (10 °C) water that is rough and spreads them around. They are all fished out except for 1; the boat was $150,000.
19	January 26, 2009	Texarkana, AR October 15, 2005 – a freight train derails and police go to the scene. State trooper Randy McAdams smells chemicals and backs up. Then an explosion occurs and soon night turns into day ahead of him as everything catches fire where he was. Then electrical power blows out. The next day the railyard is on fire, cars are burned up and a couple houses were destroyed. A tanker car with liquid propane crashed and burned.; California State Route 1 10/02 – Paul MacDonald rides his motorcycle from San Francisco to LA. He swings both legs to one side while doing a wheelie, goes into a wobble and slams into a parked car and is hit on the head and spins down the road. He broke his back.; Mid-Ohio Sports Car Course, Lexington, OH – During a gears classic race, Joey Hand goes into the grass and hits a mound that launches him, flipping him 10 times before he tumbles end over end hits the fence. He is able to walk away.; NM Desert 1988 – scientists from the US and Japan crash an F4 jet into a concrete wall to test it. The jet is on a track powered by rockets and slams into it to learn how to make better structures.; San Jose, CA – a large homeless shelter catches fire. Firemen work on it inside and out, then an entire wall collapses and pins a man underneath. Those outside were safe, no one was inside, the buried man was OK.; 120 miles off VA November 8, 1998 – USS Enterprise (CVN-65) launches Northrop Grumman EA-6B Prowlers and Lockheed S-3 Vikings all day and night. A Northrop Grumman EA-6B Prowler lands at night and crashes into a Lockheed S-3 Viking and both explode into a huge fireball on deck. The EA-6B Prowler goes over the side, killing all 4 crew members.; Sherman Reservoir, CO – a group of friends go out and party. A modified Jeep goes up a steep hill and a wheel goes over the side, he tries to back up off, then flips over and over down the hill. The driver walks away.; Bosporus, Istanbul, Turkey – ferries dock during heavy surf and the floating pier gets covered in water. Everyone is evacuated, then the entire pier flips over and sinks. It was on ballast tanks and one ruptured.
20	February 2, 2009	Mulhouse-Habsheim Airport, Mulhouse, France June 26, 1988 – Air France Flight 296 is an Airbus A320-111 low-speed flyover demonstration flight with 130 passengers and 6 crew members on board. It loses lift above the runway, goes into trees and explodes, killing 3 passengers and injuring 50 people. One hundred and thirty-three people survived.; Watkins Glen International, Watkins Glen, NY – Round 8 of the 2004 Rolex Sports Car Series. An endurance race continues in a storm. One lose control on a turn and hits a foam wall, then one after another slam into each other and the wall at 65 mph, followed by four more. The last one smashes into a wrecked Porsche at 90 mph. Two cars are destroyed.; Aniva Bay, Sakhalin, Russia – MI14 sea and land helicopter exercise. One hits the water hard, takes water and can't get lift. It nosedives and the blades rip off, killing 1.; Julian, North Carolina – Piedmont Dragway Powerjam. At night Donnie Krusinski revs his engine so hard it explodes. He pulled the safety too soon and the nitrous detonated and he climbed out of the inferno, and just suffers minor burns. He returns to racing the following month.; Montreal, Quebec, Canada – a 2-floor brick building is engulfed in fire and firemen back off and the front collapses. Right before the chief had the ladder truck back off. It takes hours to put it out. It was a welding torch that started it.; Manchester, SD June 24, 2003 – Two stormchasers drop probes in front of an F4 tornado. It takes out a farmhouse and buildings. It was a record 100-millibar drop. (similar to episode 14's version).; Red Bluff, CA 5/07 – The nitro nationals dragboat racing. Problem Child (Dale Ishimaru) has trouble in a trial and they replace a prop. In the next race, it bounces, rolls and goes right over the other boat. Ishimaru's capsule is ripped off and sent flying. He's fished out with a broken back.; U.S. Route 129 – Rob Stewart rides the 318 twist & turn, 11-mile highway on his motorcycle in Tennessee and NC Smokey Mountains – the tail of the dragon. He passes a slow bike and hits a car head on while making a turn. The bike is a loss.
21	February 2, 2009	Fort Worth, TX – chemical storage facility fire. Huge drums explode and launch hundreds of feet. Smoke can be seen for 30 miles. EPA says to let it go and it burns for 4 1/2 hours. Methanol was being unloaded and a spark ignited it.; Rantoul, Illinois August 4, 2003 – Tim Bernard does over 10,000 skydives and has to be extreme about them. He jumps 13,000 feet and tries to go through large open hangar doors. He wants it all on tape if he crashes. His chute catches the door on the way in at 65 mph and slams him to the ground, breaking his hip.; Dodge City, KS – Brain Carson does stunts. He jumps 126 feet in his car and lands upside-down on junk cars, breaking his arm. Charlotte, NC – he attempts to jump 250 feet over flatbeds and land on a pile of cars. He drops his suspension, lands on a fire cannon and flips over and over. It takes a crowd over 30 minutes to get him out.; Near Luther, OK August 22, 2008 – 110 car train derails and catches fire. Oil tankers explode in huge mushroom clouds. It takes 5 hours to get a hazmat team in to start to put it out.; Las Vegas, NV – Seth Enslow jumps his motorcycle over 70 bikes. His Honda CR250 breaks in half on landing and he's thrown skidding along.; Fonda Speedway, Fonda, NY – Johnny "the jet" Scarborough in car #61 is clipped, flips over and over and lands upside down on the wall, then explodes. He rolls out on fire. It takes over 8 minutes to put the car out. Johnny wins 3 Sportsman Division championships; Fountain Valley, CA – Gordon Bennett Memorial Balloon Race. One gets lift early and crashes into a building, spilling the pilot out onto a child. A student is alone in the ripped up balloon as it flies off. He manages to bring the balloon down safety.; Pennsylvania Route 93, Carbon County, Pennsylvania – a runaway truck ramp is filmed by the news because it is so dangerous. Then a freight truck hits the gravel piles fast, flips over, rips the front axle apart and the driver comes out of the vehicle bloody. Years later they remade the ramp. It is now straight and has smooth stones instead of gravel piles.
22	February 9, 2009	Fuji Speedway, Japan – Le Mans race in the pouring rain. The pace car goes too fast, and causes Tomohiko Sunako to spin out, crash hard, then Tetsuya Ota plows into him and explodes. The car drives on fire and is put out. Ota is badly injured and retires.; Oakland, CA – a security camera shakes and is turned to find a gas tanker plowed into the freeway. The gas tanker explodes and flames reach temperatures of 2,000 °C, causing the upper level to melt away and collapse. Another section buckles and falls onto the lower freeway. The freeway takes 26 days to repair.; Bayrischzell, Germany – Juergen Brunner drives a motorcycle on mountain roads. He loses control of the bike and plows into a rock wall and is thrown into the air. He breaks two toes and cracks a bone in his wrist. He luckily doesn't fall into a ravine on the other side of the wall.; Bocaue, Bulacan, Philippines, December 31, 2007 – The December 2007 Bocaue fire. For New Year's people buy fireworks, then a stand catches fire and blows up. It ignites ten nearby stands and shoots rockets. It was caused by a cigarette.; Wilber, NE – stormchasers find a tornado so huge they run from and a small one goes around it. They find an empty building and run in. The front of the building comes off and smashed their car. It was an F4 2 1/2 miles wide, a record.; Valletta, Malta – annual grand prix plane race over water. Eddie Goggins's aircraft's right wing clips the tail of Gabor Varga's aircraft and both go down. Eddie was able to eject, but Gabor died.; Chandler, AZ – world boat finals. James Ray wins, but the boat flips, shreds and spits the capsule out. He broke his back again along with his sternum and ribs.; Zonguldak, Turkey 8/07 – rivers overflow and take out a municipal building in a pile. Seventy percent of the area was covered in water.
23	February 16, 2009	Toronto, Ontario, Canada August 10, 2008 – The 2008 Toronto propane explosion. Sunrise Industrial Gases factory catches fire and explodes into massive fireballs. A shockwave can be felt for 10 miles. Fiery metal is launched, Freeway 401 is shut down, people are evacuated. Five thousand homes are damaged, 2 are killed. It was an illegal propane transfer that started it.; Bellaire, TX October 15, 2004 – an inebriated driver goes on a rampage in an 18-wheeler. He hits traffic and pushes vehicles out of the way. Police use spike strips and guns to disable the truck.; Oulton Park Circuit, Cheshire, England – The 2008 British GT Championship. Hunter Abbott goes to miss a car, clips it, plows into the rail, starts flipping, shredding and then it explodes. He rolls out on fire and has only minor injuries.; Pampa, TX June 8, 1995 – Sgt. Randy Stubblefield films a large tornado forming that comes down. It is a massive F4 that rips up buildings and goes across town. Forty-three houses are leveled costing $20 million.; St Petersburg, Russia 2007 – Russian M12 helicopter does maneuvers at an airshow, slams into the ground and the blades fly off towards the crowd, then it explodes. The pilot gets out just in time.; North Platte, Nebraska – a warehouse catches fire and a train goes right by it. Then propane tanks explode and the whole building is leveled.; Waterford Speedbowl, Waterford, CT 7/8 – A stock car race. Jay Lozyniak races, a couple cars hit and he is launched over them and flips. His mom Jean Fritchley films it and runs towards his wrecked car. Jay is able to walk out.; Montevideo, Uruguay – high speed boat racing. Peppy Delgado loses control and slams right into the judges' boat, smashing it in half. Both sink fast and everyone goes into the water. They're all rescued.
24	February 16, 2009	Mission Bay, San Diego, CA – Mark Workentine races a hydro fuel dragboat in a test. He flips it and it rips apart in two seconds. He opens the capsule and it takes on water, he flips over trapped, but divers get him out.; Wisconsin August 18, 2005 – The Wisconsin tornado outbreak of 2005 where 28 tornadoes hit in 1 day. In Stoughton, Cops and civilians film from all over the area. An F3 tornado repeatedly touches down then rises up. Then the F3 hits a farm across the street.; Mechanicsburg, PA – Williams Grove Speedway sprint car race. Scott Zeller in #21 clips #88, then cartwheels off the track, above a track worker, across a yard, launching car parts all over and into a metal fence. The worker was knocked out by a tire, but is okay. Zeller walks away and returns to racing.; Wageningen, Netherlands – a 16-floor college dorm catches fire from lightning. The roof shoots flames upwards and then explodes. Because of construction they had gas generators up there that blew.; Erlanger, KY February 13, 2007 – Ofc. Bill Allen goes to an accident call in the ice. The police car is hit and spins out. A woman calls 911 about her wiping out nearby. Then a semi truck loses control and hits a red car, which slams into the police car. No one is hurt.; AZ desert – 1960s Douglas DC-7 is intentionally crashed by the FAA for a test. It hits at 180 mph and it shredded in 5 seconds. The test is supposed to make aircraft safer.; Dubai, UAE – 400 mile endurance race. A man films a yellow Land Rover truck hit a bump, launching into the air and into the cameraman. They are battered, but not killed.; El Salvador 10/05 – Hurricane Stan dumps rain for five days. Roads are washed away, trees and power lines go down. Seventy-five percent of crops are ruined in 700 mudslides.
25	February 23, 2009	Tacoma, WA October 6, 2007 – a propane truck unloads into a storage tank. It starts to leak, and smoke covers the area. Then the truck catches fire spewing up to the freeway. 8000 gallons explode destroying the area. Firemen put it out and find the driver, who died a week later.; Marble Falls, TX – Todd Odom races top fuel hydro Spirit of Texas, the boat then rips to pieces and his capsule is thrown free. His blast plate came off causing the boat to lose stability.; Cornwall, England November 13, 1991 – Matt 'The Kangaroo Kid' Coulter from Australia jumps a riverboat on an ATV. He hits the top of the riverboat and is thrown into the river. A year later – August 13, 1992, he does it again with faster ATV and longer ramp, clears the jump, but hits the ground so hard he is thrown. He rips out every ligament in his knee and loses feeling.; Howick Falls, South Africa – Jeb Corliss basejumps from anything he can around the world. He jumps from atop the falls, pulls his chute and is blown into the falls, he is knocked around, broken and attacked by crabs. He spends a month in the hospital with broken ribs and feet.; Geelong, Victoria – a DJ and two others ride in a Huey 300 helicopter around the water. The pilot goes to land on Cunningham Pier and a downdraft knocks them in the water. All make it out.; Santa Fe, Argentina – a bus hits a car and goes over a bridge into a river. They use a large crane to pull it out, but it is too heavy and the crane goes over too.; Glamis Sand Dunes, Glamis, CA – Seth Enslow is a motocross bike jumper. He takes a jump and lands in a crowd of people when he doesn't get enough height. He's fine, bike is not.; Crescent City, IL June 21, 1970 – the first propane train disaster. A car derails, catches fire, then blows up. A second explosion launches a car into a house. They let it burn 56 hours. It destroys much of the town.
26	February 23, 2009	Enschede, Netherlands – The Enschede fireworks disaster. A fireworks warehouse catches fire and people fill the streets to watch. Then the fireworks erupt and people start running for safety. The whole thing detonates, breaks glass and smashes nearby buildings. A second bigger explosion throws the cameraman. The entire area is leveled, 400 houses were damaged, and 23 are killed.; Santa Ynez, California – Dan Pastor makes a 200-foot jump for his motocross bike. He goes too fast, lands too far, and the bike breaks on impact, throwing him. His face is bloody and he broke his pelvis, back, ribs, jaw and is airlifted out. A year later he makes the same jump safely.; Needles, CA – Paul Curry soups up his raceboat, takes it on the river and launches. It slams down and he's thrown 25 feet across the river while his boat sinks. He floats and starts yelling about his back. He broke four ribs and punctured his lung. All he could save was the engine.; Claremont Speedway, Western Australia – Aaron Holswich races sprint cars on a dirt track. On a turn he is bumped, he flips five times and gets stuck on the fence up in the air as gas pours out. They yank him out and soon afterwards the car explodes. He damages the blood vessels in his eyes.; Denver, CO November 8, 2008 – A group of people are interrupted at a restaurant by a car crashing into it after an argument between the driver and another man. One diner is pinned against the wall by the car. The driver flees the scene, but is later arrested.; Corpus Christi, Texas – Jet ski qualifying. Jerry Ellison races, stalls and collides with another jet ski. He loses his spleen and part of his pancreas.; Valle de Bravo, Mexico – Joe Parr paraglides and loses control. His chute gets snagged on a tree, then a moment later the chute snaps and he falls 25 feet. The tree branches help to break his fall. He suffers minor injuries from the fall, but shatters a rib from the pull of the reserve chute opening.; USS Kitty Hawk (CV-63) July 11, 1994 – An F-14 Tomcat strikes the rear edge of the carrier USS Kitty Hawk and explodes. Both crew members eject. The RIO lands safely, but the pilot descends directly into the flames.
27	March 2, 2009	Plesetsk Cosmodrome, Russia 2002 – Soyuz rocket with photo-satellite nighttime launch. Twenty-nine seconds later, it falls to earth in a massive explosion. Something got into an intake pipe and all engines shut down. It was worth $16 million. On the ground, eight people are injured, one is killed.; Flagler Beach, FL December 15, 1997 – men work on an 800-foot pier damaged in a storm the year before. Storms hit the pier for 8 days and 20-foot waves hit their crane, then 90 feet of the pier from the end is ripped off and floats away.; Oulton Park Circuit, Cheshire, England – A GT race is hit by huge rain. One car puts on rain tires, but there is little visibility. Cars skid off-road and a Porsche's bumper is ripped off when it slides off the track. #8 wipes out and #9 plows into it. Track workers go out and then a Dodge Viper slides out of control and hits a worker. The Marshall misses being crushed by the car. A Ferrari spins out, then a TVR rams into the Ferrari at high speed, then ricochets into the Dodge Viper and #9, leaving car parts and metal spilled all over the track. A million dollars' worth of cars are destroyed.; San Bernardino County, California – Seth Enslow wants to set a record 275-foot jump on his motorcycle. Wind makes him go too far, he tries to slow down, misses the ramp, slams his face into the handlebars and shatters an eye socket.; Boise, ID 1998 – Chris Shivers at the bull-riding blowout rides Shorty the bull. It throws him, then headbutts him to the ground knocking him out. The bull continues to trample Chris until Shorty calms down for a moment and gives rescuers time to attend to Chris's injuries. Then, the bull bashes Chris one last time before it is brought back by wranglers. Chris survives.; Mediterranean Sea 11/51 – George Duncan flies a F9F-2 Panther on a test to land on the USS Midway aircraft carrier. He lands, goes around, then hits the edge of the deck and explodes. He survives with burns to his ears.; Virgin, UT – James Wolken rides a BMX bike doing jumps. He tries to jump 35 feet over a SUV and hits the other wall and falls onto the SUV and the bike breaks.; Sittard, Netherlands – A biomass energy plant overheats and firemen arrive. The cooling system falls and pressure is releasing. Smoke pours out and turns black, then the whole building explodes. An oil leak caused it to fail.
28	March 2, 2009	Buenos Aires, Argentina – an 18-wheeler on an overpass loses control after going too fast. It hits the overpass railing and the entire cargo of lemons falls to the street below sending people running.; Blumenau, Brazil 11/08 – The 2008 Santa Catarina floods. Thirty-five inches of rain falls and mudslides rip up the countryside. A house falls down a hill and wipes out another house. Then mud covers it and more houses nearby are taken out on Herman Hoosier street.; Tampa, FL – Steve Trotter and four guys try to pendulum swing at once on the Sunshine Skyway Bridge. Jeff Sargent goes at the last second. The rope snaps and they all smash into the water. Two boats yank them out with broken necks and collarbones. They also were arrested and receive probation.; Lions Head Peak, MT – Trennis Baer and friends ride their snowmobiles up the mountain, then he starts an avalanche and races it to the bottom. A year later they do it again in the same spot and the same thing happens again. This time, he is launched and tumbles 1000 feet down in the snow. They find him and dig him out.; Bath, England – During a Caterham race, Paul Wickford in car #66 tries to pass car #15 but then clips the rear right tire of car #15 and then wipes out and flies through the air and into a wall, nearly crushing car #51 which also spun out.; Rialto, CA – At the 5th annual desert jump championship, Chad Walton hits a ramp, His truck drops and flips three times, then explodes. He is yanked out, losing the competition for not driving away. Instead, organizers present Chad with a new trophy for style.; Farnborough, England – at the airshow a 1980 DHC-5 Buffalo cargo plane lands too hard, it explodes and the wings break off, and a propeller hits a car. Both pilots walk away.; Dallas, TX – An 18-wheeler wipes out and crews work on it. A helicopter on scene catches an 18-wheeler on the other side of the road crash, hitting a news van and then exploding. The axle rips off and the passenger is thrown out.
29	March 9, 2009	Edison, NJ – The 1994 Edison, New Jersey natural gas explosion. An asphalt plant gas-line catches fire next to the Durham Woods apartments. They are told to evacuate, then the line explodes. John records it and tries to escape. A backhoe damaged it and it finally ruptured. It makes a 75-foot crater; 8 buildings are obliterated. Unfortunately, one person dies from a heart attack during the evacuation.; Peekskill, NY – the town is moving a 118-year-old fire house to expand the road and make it into a museum across town. An end starts to crack, then a lift fails and the whole building collapses into rubble. Workers need to be accounted for, but are OK.; Weston-super-Mare, England – Chris Gagnon wants to do a backflip on his ATV and trains with a foam pit. He does the ramp to ramp jump and lands hard. He does it again in Pomona, CA, but falls off midway, hits the ramp from 40 feet and the ATV lands on him. The rained-on dirt ground slowed him down. He sprained his wrist from the fall and getting hit by the ATV broke his leg.; Imnaha, Oregon January 1, 1997 – John Howerton films flooding as it tears up roads and houses. Then a red house is ripped away and floats down river into a bridge breaking it up.; Donington Park Circuit, England – TVR Tuscan challenge – cars bump, spin out, then on lap 5 Troy Dunlop in car #4 hits Richard Stanton in car #17, he turns over, then flips again and again ripping apart.; Kansas City, Missouri January 7, 2009 – A helicopter follows police chasing a stolen red pickup on the freeway. The truck gets off the highway, into a neighbourhood, then loses control and hits a white parked car, spins around, hits a tree, flips over and is torn in half.; Victoria, Australia – Victoria Air show. An ultralight loses control, takes off and goes across the tarmac into the crowd. It goes around in circles until it hits a parked plane. A woman is knocked down by it. The plane was unmanned, the gear stuck.; Delaware International Speedway, DE – Modified dirt racing. Car #6 skids, hits #55 and it hits #54 with John Keller into the walk, launching him high in the air into a fence and tires fly off. He is stuck upside down and a tow truck flips him over. He has a concussion, bruised lung, rib and a broken arm, but returns to race again.
30	March 9, 2009	Des Moines, IA – Barton Solvents catches fire. Thick black smoke fills the sky, then huge explosions erupt again and again from 55-gallon drums launching them through the air and keeping firemen back. The whole area is evacuated. Ethyl acetate was ignited by static.; USS Theodore Roosevelt, Persian Gulf 1991 – an A6 Intruder sucks a helmet off a man. JD Bridges is sucked into an intake of a jet after standing instead of kneeling to inspect the launching mechanism, but survives.; Maryland International Speedway – American Drag Racing league championships. Tommy Franklin races a 1968 Chevy Camaro and goes right into a wall, flips over and over as he shreds it. The parachute wraps around the body. Rescuers shut down the engine and Tommy is able to walk away.; Lake Delton, WI 6/08 – Storms dump a foot of rain and the dam overflows into the river washing away roads, soil, trees and houses. The Fromm family works frantically to save their house, but everything washes away. The entire lake is drained.; Nottingham, England – British F1 boat grand prix. John Jones gets air, flies up high, flips over and over before finally landing upside down. He is knocked out; divers fish him out and an ambulance takes him away. He is back at the race later that day, mad that they were warned to keep their distance.; Cayuga County, NY – Mod light car race on dirt. Don Fenner #28 tries to pass, hits a wall, slips, flips over, Rocco Leone #87 hits him, then two other cars hit them. Rocco's car is flipped, then explodes. Rocco rolls out with a glove on fire that will not go out. They put the car away and get Don out.; Keystone, CO – Snowmobilers jump a 100-foot ramp at 80 mph. Snow melts in the sun and it is longer when Brian Hennek jumps it. He smacks into the other side, breaking both ankles, heel and vertebrae.; Portland, OR 1995 – Bubba Blackwell does a motorcycle jump over 13 cars, he hits the other ramp on the edge, the bike flips and he is thrown into the pavement and crushed by the bike, suffering a broken collarbone, scapula, two broken ribs and a punctured lung.
31	March 16, 2009	Wichita, KS 7/02 – Summer Nationals International raceway drag racing at night. Jerry Yeoman makes it to the finals, hits an oil slick and slams into a wall, goes over it and flips 18 times in a fiery wreck. He survives with a broken collarbone.; Cuscatlán, El Salvador December 16, 2008 – a man illegally sells propane tanks out of his house. He fills tanks, has a leak that starts a fire and causes other tanks to explode a dozen times. Nine houses were damaged. Ironically, the man's house is the only one completely destroyed and he's the only one injured.; Red Bluff, CA May 26, 2002 – International Hot Boat Association drag race – hydroboats race. Mark Atkinson soups his up, then goes airborne, flips and the boat is ripped apart. He opens the capsule and it flips over and fills with water. His head injuries end his career.; Boca Reno – the Brazilian Navy's munitions depot blows up into a nuclear size mushroom cloud. It keeps exploding and burning for over five hours. 37 homes are destroyed and 23 people are hurt.; Sacramento, CA – At a drag race Hans Kuesel loses control, hits the wall, blows up, then slides down the track on his side and his car is ripped in half.; Angeles Crest Highway, CA – Makoto Sullivan films from his motorcycle up the long winding road. Ten other guys ride with him and when they stop one guy clips a bike and plows into Orlando Pablo at full speed. He's thrown, knocked out and airlifted away suffering only a concussion.; Dorset, England – Poole Harbour ferries carry cars across. An ebb tide crashed a yacht into a ferry with a 72-year-old woman, her husband and a friend on board the yacht. Another boat tries to pull it out and it is sucked under. Two men hold on as the woman is sucked under. They throw a mat and life-ring down, then a dinghy tries to pull them out, but is also pulled against the ferry. They grab the husband, the people on the boat grab the friend, and the woman is pulled under and surfaces on the other side of the ferry.; Seoul, South Korea – At a carnival, six elephants escape; three are caught and the others attack a restaurant. They get into the kitchen and people run for safety as the elephants smash the windows. the restaurant reopens two weeks later, now with an elephant theme.
32	March 16, 2009	Riobamba, Ecuador – On election night reporter Juan Gutierrez is covering voting, then an ammunition depot explodes. It causes bombs and rockets to detonate and a huge mushroom cloud forms. People run for cover and explosions continue. The city is evacuated for days as the Army collects bombs. 7 people die, and 300 are injured.; Fairbanks, Alaska – World Ice Art Championships contest. The Birth of the Bluebird is worked on for 100 hours. Junichi Nakamura cuts the final pillar and the whole thing breaks. A crack had formed at the torso.; Ursa, IL December 8, 1989 – Stan Frazier tries to remove two 60-foot grain silos from his yard with a bulldozer. One has a tree with bird's nest. First he tries to pull it down with a chain and it breaks, the second time the silo just drops 4 feet, leaning to one side. Frustrated, Stan pushes the silo and it collapses on the bulldozer. The cage and roof saves him.; Anchorage, Alaska – Mulcahy Stadium Fairbanks Bucks baseball game. A Cessna 207 skywagon loses power and crashes behind the outfield wall, hits a fence and flips over. The engine rips out and catches fire. Four people were on board and all lived. They forgot to check gas on one side.; Irwindale Speedway, CA – at a stock car race on lap 40 car #4 hits #34, then slides into an edge barrier and flips over. Todd Burns & Kevin Wood are inside. Wood is trapped upside down, but walks away, along with Burns.; Kernersville, NC January 14, 2009 – Cops go to a house fire where a 911 call says people are inside. Firemen are told it is empty and go in to check when the whole house explodes, lifting it off the foundation. Only one fireman had minor injuries. A backdraft caused the explosion.; Blacktown, New South Wales 1994 – Eastern Creek Raceway drag racing. Romeo Capitanio's back tires blow up and he flips over.; Alicante, Spain – an armed 25-year-old takes over a bank with eight hostages. He releases six for a motorcycle, rides off to escape, but cops cut him off with an unmarked police car and send him flying. Cops grab him and an ambulance takes him away.; Circuit de Spa-Francorchamps, Spa, Belgium – Formula Palmer Series racing. Tim Mullen gets clipped in the back, his car spins out, crashes into a wall and catches fire. He is trapped and has to be pulled out.
33	March 23, 2009	Bonneville Salt Flats, UT – Jim Meader wants the production car speed record of 241 mph. He gets his Mazda RX-7 up to 230 mph, adds power and goes in the air, spins around, comes apart and slides upside-down and the parachute deploys. It catches fire and he has to crawl out and put the fire out.; El Toro Air Show, Orange County, CA – Jerry Caddock of the Marines flies an F/A-18 Hornet does the square Immelman on the third day and slams into the runway at 300 mph. His engine catches fire and he slides out of control. He broke his neck, compressed his spine and punctured a lung.; Mount Shasta CA – a crew films extreme skiers. They build 100-foot ramps and have to be towed by a snowmobile at 65 mph to make the jump. Derek Spong thinks he can make it on his own and misses because of the melting snow. He hits the ramp and is knocked out. He broke ribs, and tore his spleen and aorta.; Omsk, Russia July 6, 2000 – a gasoline fire near 60,000-gallon train tank cars. They try to cool the cars, but one explodes in a huge fireball. It is peeled like fruit.; Sydney, New South Wales – St. George Speedboat race. Malcolm McCall races his boat. Wind gets under his bow and it flips 30 feet. He is thrown out across the water at 120 mph. The engine explodes and the boat sinks. He broke 6 ribs and 3 vertebrae.; VA 1995 – NASA launches the Conestoga 1620 rocket. It has a malfunction and automatically self-destructs. Two of six the boosters don't self-destruct and fly wildly until they land in the Atlantic Ocean.; Julian, NC – Big Dog Shootout drag race. Junior Ward vs. Ricky Young. At the start Ricky's axle breaks and he crashes right into Junior destroying his car. The impact lifts his onto its side as it hits the wall and bursts in flames. The car slides down the track.; 200 miles off Australia – the cargo ship Laura is knocked to one side and fuel cargo all goes to one side and it rolls over. The crew evacuates to two rafts and are stranded for seven hours. The navy rescues them.
34	March 23, 2009	Willowbank Raceway, Queensland, Australia – Willowbank Raceway New Year's drag racing night fire series. Stephen Reed's car wobbles and explodes. He pulls the extinguisher, hits the wall and his body flies 30 feet up in the air. The chassis keeps going and chutes deploy. It was caused by a broken fuel line.; Delft, Netherlands – Delft University of Technology has a fire on the 7th floor caused by an electrical fire. It takes four hours to put it out, then a section from six floors up collapses and starts a new fire. The building has to be demolished. The historical records held in the building are found undamaged in the rubble.; Melbourne, FL – Airboat racing across 400 feet of swamp. Billy Willard wins and starts celebrating, but doesn't hit a lever to stabilize the boat. It flips over and he is slammed into the water. The boat lands upside-down and is destroyed while Billy is badly bruised, but recovers.; Chesterton, IN – St. Patrick's Church catches fire and 30 firemen work to put it out. They are warned that the steeple is on the verge of collapse. A fireman is pulling an empty hose by it and he dives trying to get away as the steeple falls next to him. It takes three hours to put the fire out.; Tulsa, OK – Chillibowl Midget nationals. Tim McCreadie has a lead in a qualifying race until his right rear tire broke off. He flipped four times and went over the fence. He could not get out. He broke a vertebra in his back.; Maui, HI – Jaws waves go from 12 to 60 feet. Surfers are towed in by jetskis to build the speed needed. Sierra Emory windsurfs a 40-foot wave and ditches when a surfer comes up on him. He is submerged before resurfacing, and a jetski comes out to rescue him, but they are knocked over by a wall of whitewater. Two more jetskis rescue both of them and his board.; Danville, WV – At a convenience store, a soda vendor is going to leave when out-of-control truck hits the pumps and crashes into the front of the store. The driver has fallen asleep with his foot on the gas. A support beam flies over the cashier's head. To prevent it from reoccurring, the store's owners put up boulders around the property.; Lebanon Valley Speedway, NY – Wildman Al Sleet jumped a garbage truck 74 feet for a record. he drives a dump truck that catches fire and drives into a school bus standing on end, but he hits the side and flips his truck where he is trapped.
35	March 30, 2009	Istanbul, Turkey – An oil tanker catches fire and massive fireballs erupt. The fire was not contained until next morning.; Chugach Mountains, Valdez, Alaska – Pro skier Garrett Bartelt loses his balance and tumbles down the mountain, over a cliff, falls 25 feet and is unconscious in the snow. Rescuers find him alive and he is airlifted to the hospital with a compound fracture to his leg.; Queensland Raceway, Queensland, Australia – Round 5 of the 1999 Australian Formula Ford Championship. A blue car flips and sends sparks flying throughout the track, then goes into the grass and cartwheels. Driver Greg Ritter walks away. Despite the crash, Greg wins the championship at the end of the season.; Lima, Peru – A paint factory is on fire and firemen come to the scene. Then, a backdraft explosion erupts and injures firefighters.; Queensland, Australia – In Moreton Bay, a sailboat is capsized by a wave and the family onboard has to be rescued. A responding rescue boat is also caught by the waves and flips upside-down.; Somewhere in the Gulf of Mexico, on the USS Lexington, October 29, 1989 – A T-2 Buckeye training jet proceeds to land on the carrier, but the pilot suddenly loses control and crashes upside down onto other planes. Five are killed, including the pilot.; Mechanicsburg, PA – At the Williams Grove Speedway, a collision causes Lance Dewease and another driver's sprint cars to cartwheel and crash. Both drivers are okay and each car costs $50,000.; Bogotá, Colombia – A tower crane is helping to remove a eucalyptus tree. When lifting a limb that is too heavy for it to handle, the crane collapses. The concrete blocks on the crane's counterweight smash onto a car. No one is killed and the three people in the car are not hurt.
36	March 30, 2009	Bakersfield, CA – Mike Boyd is driving The Winged Express drag car, when it loses a wheel then it crashes into a wall and flips over. Mike is able to walk away uninjured.; San Diego, California – The 1995 Louis Vuitton Cup. While race yachts try to catch up with defending champions One Australia, one yacht tears a hole in the sail, and another tips over. Then, the One Australia race boat breaks apart and sinks, sending its crew into the seas. All are rescued and return to compete in their backup boat.; Colorado Springs, CO – French stuntman Manu Troux participates in a motocross freestyle competition. He needs to put together a stellar run in order to appease the American crowd. He tries a notoriously difficult stunt called the Double Grab, where the rider must let go of the handlebars, touch the side panels then get back on the bike. During Manu's attempt, however, he launches his bike too far out of reach, causing him to fall dozens of feet to the ground. He is taken to the hospital with a broken femur and he will race again.; Melbourne, Australia – During a track bicycle race, one collision results in 15 cyclists crashing in a pile-up. Cyclist Jamie Crass is nearly thrown off the track onto the concrete floor below. The casualties suffered minor cuts and bruises.; Chandler, AZ – A speedboat breaks apart and sends the capsule and driver Scott Lumbert smashing into an island at triple-digit speeds. He has a concussion, fractures his back and neck and breaks a vertebra, but recovers and returns to racing.; Cedar Park, TX – An F3 tornado comes down and destroys 11 houses and 3 businesses.; Immokalee, FL – Kevin Conti wipes out in his Camaro dragster into the wall and sends debris flying toward the cameraman. He suffers a broken arm, broken leg, several broken ribs and a broken T2 vertebrae.; Aichi Prefecture, Japan – A truck had an accident with a train. The truck falls off a bridge and into a ravine beneath the tracks. They use two cranes to pull the truck and trailer out, but the flatbed is too heavy and the crane lifting it tips over. Both the train and truck are safely removed after.
37	April 2, 2009	Zambales, Philippines – While testing a flare system, a flare ignites in the system of an F-4 Phantom II, destroying the tail. The pilots injure their necks and with extreme G-forces as they eject. The plane nosedives and slams into the ground in a fiery explosion. It cost $24 million.; South Africa – The Oceanos cruise liner is wrecked and the crew abandons ship, leaving all the passengers behind. Helicopters arrive at the scene and rescue all 581 passengers.; Steamboat Springs, Colorado 2005 – The inaugural season of the Rally America. Racers from around the world race around treacherous dirt roads. Stunt performer Travis Pastrana accelerates to 113 mph across a straight road, but does not notice the oncoming turn. The car is launched and flips eight times. Despite the car being a loss, Pastrana and his navigator walk away.; Mersin, Turkey – Worker Cem Tokac is guiding a truck across the tracks when a faulty signal causes a train to hit the truck, mowing Tokac down. He miraculously survives with minor injuries and declares the day of the incident his new birthday.; Chandler, AZ – A speedboat crashes and the capsule's canopy bursts open, flinging racer Lloyd Bell free. He's trapped underwater for just over a minute before being rescued. He broke his tibia in 15 places and has severe bruising to his backside.; Ramona, CA – At an ultralight airshow, Donny Ecker performs stunts and loops with his ultralight. He tries to dive from 5000 ft and then do a loop, but the extreme G-forces snap the cables supporting the left wing. Donny pulls the chute and floats down to a hard landing. He survives.; Willowbank Raceway, Queensland, Australia – A motorcycle modified for drag racing goes out of control and hits the wall, sending the motorcycle and its rider, Rodney Silvestro, sliding down the track. His helmet and kevlar-padded racing suit saves him from injuries.; Paranaguá, Brazil – A propane plant catches fire and multiple tanks explode at once, resulting in a massive explosion. It took hours for firemen to contain the fire.
38	April 2, 2009	Brooklyn, NY – A news helicopter blows a tail rotor and crashes on the roof of a building before falling onto an adjacent building. All three occupants walk away.; Byron, IL – A drag race wheelie competition. Jason Schubert comes up with a long wheelie, but he slips and barrel rolls three and a half times down the track. He, however, wins the competition but says that the car is a $100,000 loss.; Västerås, Sweden – During an off-road motorcycle race, Nicholas Hermansson's bike veers across the track and T-bones racer Andre Nilsson. Hermanson only has a broken arm, while Nilsson breaks eight ribs, his sternum, and a shoulder joint, which ends his career.; Honshu, Japan 2004 – Unusually heavy rain cause multiple soil erosions. One piece of a mountain road is severely buckled and crews work on it, then the retaining wall collapses and the road slides into the ravine. One hundred miles away, officers on the scene capture fences, utility poles and trees all sliding down. In all, 100 meters of road are destroyed.; Bathurst, Australia – Len Cave miscalculates the "Caltex Chase" turn and barrel rolls his race car 10 times. He breaks four ribs and bruises his face.; Brooklyn Park, MN – A car crashes into a beauty store. A boy playing by himself is nearly hit. No one is hurt. The driver says she was groggy after going to the dentist.; Miami, OK – Trigger Gumm, attempting to set a new world record for a jump, lands hard and wipes out, breaking five vertebrate.; Anaheim, CA – Three college students are on a baseball tour to visit 12 different stadiums. They find a Cessna 175 out of fuel preparing to make an emergency landing. The aircraft touches down on a carpark, bounces, and crashes into a cinder block wall at the end. The pilot and passenger walk away.
39	April 13, 2009	Walton Hills, OH – A magnesium recycling plant explodes, troubling firemen who spray water on it instead of using sand. The fire is eventually put out.; Bakersfield, CA – Drag racer Tom Padilla is competing in his first race with his Red Dragon funny car when the body is blasted away and shoots 300 feet into the air leaving only the chassis.; Melbourne, Australia – James "Bubba" Chiasson, an amateur daredevil, attempts a stunt jump, but misses the ramp and crashes. He manages to fully recover.; Houston, TX – Police chase a drunk driver, and the drunk driver loses control of his car and barrel rolls down the neighbourhood. He is swiftly arrested.; Finland – A race car driven by Julian Roderick and David Allen Holmes goes out of control and cartwheels into the crowd. No one is killed.; Seattle, WA 1996 – On the USS Lincoln, an F/A-18 Hornet crashes on the edge of the carrier due to deck movement. The pilot ejects safely.; Orlando, FL – Eddie Timal's drag car crashes outside the track and rips into shreds as it flips four times.; Grenchen, Switzerland – An AS350 helicopter loses control while landing and flips onto its side.
40	April 13, 2009	St. Louis, MO 2005 – A gas station explodes sending hundreds of fireballs and burning debris into the air. No one is killed directly from the blasts, but one person has a fatal asthma attack from the fumes.; Phillip Island, Australia – Round 12 of the 1992 Superbike World Championship. Racer Stéphane Mertens wipes out and his bike continues down the track in flames before it crashes into a ditch. Fortunately, no other racer was affected and Mertens only has a shoulder injury.; San Diego, CA – Wind causes both John Prevost and Ron Snyder's boats to flip and crash. Both drivers escape without injury.; Kalgoorlie, Australia – Ray Baumann attempts a world-record 45-car jump, but he comes up short and his car is literally torn in half. He survives.; Baker, CA – Seth Enslow jumps a sand dune and crashes violently, but he survives.; Somewhere in the Pacific Ocean – An F-14 Tomcat on a test flight reaches the speed of sound, then explodes. The pilots survive.; Sault Ste. Marie, MI – At the 1996 I-500 snowmobile race, cold temperatures create fog, which limits visibility for the racers. This causes a pile-up involving five snowmobiles. One racer is knocked off his snowmobile, while another is hit and knocked off his feet. The riders emerge with broken bones and cuts.; Fremont, CA – Mike Grieco wipes out during a drag race after a wobbling tire causes him to hit his head on the roll-cage which knocks him out. Mike's car smashes into a wall, breaking into two pieces.; Sonora, Mexico – A group of friends go climbing on sand dunes. A black SUV climbs the dune at an angle, rather than up and down. It loses control, then barrel rolls ten times down the dune. The driver survives.
41	September 10, 2009	São Paulo, Brazil – Multiple explosions from a plant that makes cleaning products destroys several houses. Though the factory is in a densely populated neighborhood, only 12 people are injured.; Salt Lake City, UT – Freestyle skiers construct a ramp called Chad's Gap and attempt to do '720s' on it. Tanner Hall tries to do it backwards, but hits the edge of the ramp and breaks his ankles and a heel. He is airlifted to a hospital and makes a full recovery.; Crandon, WI – The Crandon International Off-Road Raceway has been marred by several accidents on the course. In one particular race, Curt Leduc cuts a turn too fast and rolls, but lands on all four tires and continues racing. However, his right front axle has snapped, causing him to lose control and smash into a tree and barrel rolls. The net at the window is ripped off. Curt is okay.; Deerfield Beach, FL – A car crashes into a DMV office full of people.; Chandler, AZ – Ralph Padilla is racing his flat bottom drag boat, when it cartwheels and crashes, trapping him underwater. He suffers three fractured vertebrate, but survives.; Colombia – Multiple houses are washed away when a landslide – caused by an earthquake – causes the Paez River to overflow.; Maribor, Slovenia – Aleš Senekovič leans too far right when going around a curve on a motorcycle, and he wipes out and is flattened by a speeding car. His helmet acts as ramp, and propels the car over his body. He has a concussion, five broken ribs an injury to his liver, but lives.; Lebanon – An A-7 Corsair falls off the edge of the aircraft carrier USS America. Pilot Charlie Boh ejects, but is slammed against the side of the carrier by a wind gust. He suffers five cracked ribs and a broken hip.
42	September 10, 2009	Jaipur, India – During a transfer of propane, a leak causes a gas station to catch fire. Residents watch on when suddenly, a massive explosion erupts and sends shockwaves throughout the neighbourhood. Three are killed and 15 injured.; Andover, KS 1991 – The Andover tornado outbreak. A tornado ravages through a military base and chases storm chasers, who hide under a bridge. They hang on to the girders with a father and his two daughters.; Indianapolis, IN – Jet engine drag racing. A drag car flies off the track when the chute is deployed, trapping the driver, George Elliot, who is uninjured.; Houston, TX – A series of accidents involving the Houston METRORail.; Chandler, AZ – A freak accident on the water catapults a racer into the path of his own speeding boat.; Pevely, MO – The Pevely Dairy Company Plant is destroyed under a massive fire.; Healy, Alaska – Amateur daredevil Mark Cude tries a jump with a motorcycle. On the first attempt, he comes up short of the ramp. On his second attempt, he goes too fast, misses the ramp, and lands hard, which breaks his femur bone.; Tempe, AZ – A new bridge linking Phoenix to Tempe collapses under raging floodwaters of the Salt River.
43	September 10, 2009	Willis, TX – At a gas station, a truck plows into a convenience store. An 8-year-old boy is pinned down by the truck while another two people are buried by debris. The truck driver states that his brakes locked up, causing the crash. Damages to the store are $100,000 and to prevent this from happening again, the owner installs barriers around the property.; Winter Haven, FL – F1 Boat Racing. Greg Foster loses control of his boat and collides with Carlos Kuri's boat. Kuri is unhurt but Foster breaks two vertebrae.; Gilford, NH – During Flip Fest, motocross freestyler TJ Russell attempts to set a new backflip record of 100 ft on a pit bike. He under-rotates and lands upside down. TJ sustains brusied kidneys, a brusied liver, and a concussion. He returns to compete the next day.; Manitoba, Canada – The 2007 Elie, Manitoba tornado, the strongest tornado recorded in Canada.; Bakersfield, CA – Lisa Lavoie participates in a drag race. Right from the start, she loses control and slams into her opponent Darrell Waters, causing both cars to hit the wall. Lisa suffers severe bruising and an injury to her back. She believes that Darrell's dragster cushioned the blow between her and the wall, saving her life.; Toulouse, France – An arson fire in an industrial factory causes a massive explosion. It's connected to a series of fires started over the election of a prime minister.; Delray Beach, FL – Pro kiteboarder Dimitri Maramenides performs stunts for a commercial. He shows off some tricks and jumps over a pier house. On his second attempt to jump the house, a sudden gust of wind suddenly cause the rear of Dmitri's kiteboard to smash into the beam of the roof. He then falls 10 feet off the roof, knocking his head on a railing. He suffers a fractured rib and pelvis. Dimitri manages to stay conscious and continues to kiteboard.; – During its time at NASA, the Lunar Landing Research Vehicle (LLRV) is involved in three accidents with each of the three pilots testing it: Neil Armstrong, Stuart Present and Joe Algranti, ejecting before the crash and being unhurt.
44	September 17, 2009	Mount Waddington, British Columbia, Canada – Andrea Benning and her three male friends go skiing on the mountain. The first three skiers slide down without incident while triggering mini-avalanches. Andrea goes last, and the avalanche triggered consumes her. She falls 1000 ft down the mountain. When the snow settles, she is buried from the waist-down. She only injured her knee, and It takes her a year to recover and ski again. The cause of the unexpected massive avalanche is the extra 59 inches of snow that piled up over the past 5 days.; Limon, Costa Rica 2006 – A chemical factory and a tanker truck are on fire. The area is cordoned off and more than 300 people are evacuated. The tanks burn until the pressure becomes too great and a blast 400 ft tall erupts from the inferno. The fire took 10 hours to be extinguished. 3 are killed, 20 are injured. The fire was started when welders were working near a chemical transfer.; Aloha Stadium, Honolulu, HI – Robbie Knievel comes up short of the ramp during a jump and is thrown from his bike.; São Paulo, Brazil – During a windstorm, window washers Gutiano Santos and Lando Barros, cling for their lives as the platform smashes glass windows. A woman uses her jacket to help the men into the building. The two men only have bumps and bruises.; Haines, Alaska – Rob Hehnlin is jumping his snowmobile across a road with his friends, when he goes too slow, jumping off his snowmobile before his legs hit a guardrail. One of Rob's legs kicks him in the face. He shatters his knees and ankles.; New York City, NY – A building catches fire and firemen put it out. Just as they are about to wrap up, a water hose dislodges a chunk of mortar that hits the center of the building, causing a domino effect that collapses the whole building.; Norwalk, OH – Drag racing at Norwalk Raceway Park. Liquid gets under racer Eddie Harris' drag car and it hits the wall and barrel rolls. Eddie's not hurt, but gives up racing.; Springfield, MO – An elderly woman suffers a diabetic seizure and crashes into an empty car parked in front of the Springfield Music store. The force pushed the car straight into the store, destroying the counter. It took office workers awhile to find out what happened.
45	September 24, 2009	Monza, Italy – The 2008 Le Mans Series. Stéphane Ortelli loses control of his car and comes within inches of another racer as he cartwheels across the track. He only breaks an ankle.; Tultepec, Mexico – A fireworks market sells fireworks in preparation for independence day, but a stall goes up in flames, then soon the entire market explodes.; Calgary, Canada – Zeb Lanham is knocked off a bull named Wranglers Rock Star, then the bull tosses him 6 meters in the air. He lands hard, breaking multiple ribs and his wrist.; Persian Gulf July 2002 – A Sikorsky SH-3 Sea King crash lands on the naval deck of the USS Cushing, then falls into the water. All 7 occupants survive.; Tsawwassen, British Columbia, Canada – Tracey Latham attempts a dangerous stunt and falls, severely injuring both his legs. The accident ends his jumping career.; Riceville, IA – A large tornado destroys a farm.; Primm, NV – Joe Bettencourt wipes out and barrel rolls his top fuel sand dragster over 7 times. As his dragster flips, the force causes Joe's arms to stick out of the cockpit. He suffers a cracked vertebrae and a mild concussion. Despite his injuries being fresh, Joe is back making runs again soon.; Forestville, Maryland – A Ledo Pizza outlet at the Penn Mar shopping centre is destroyed by a gas explosion, along with four other outlets.
46	September 24, 2009	Lamesa, TX – A tank battery spectacularly explodes after getting struck by lightning. One tank is launched into the sky like a rocket, landing 75 yards away. A second tank blows off its lid and it rolls 60 feet away.; Paris, France – The Paris Air Show. A Sukhoi Su-30 fighter jet attempts a downward spiral, but it cannot recover and the tail nozzle scraps the ground causing the plane to catch fire as it struggles to stay airborne. The two crew members eject from the plane as it stalls and crashes.; Assen, Netherlands August 9, 2002 – Round 12 of the 2002 Superbike World Championship. A motorcycle's engine catches fire and Christian Kellner is launched towards the safety barrier, where another motorcycle flies and grazes his head. Then, spilled oil causes four more motorcycles to crash causing a pile-up. While Kellner and another racer suffer a dislocated shoulder and a broken collarbone respectively, no one is killed.; St. Louis River, St. Louis, MO – Mayhem erupts at an F1 boat race, when racer Jim McKay strays off course, causing a collision with Guido Cappellini. Both are uninjured.; Phoenix, AZ – A motel catches fire and firemen come to the scene. While trying to put out a fire inside a room, the burning roof suddenly collapses and buries two firemen. Luckily, they crawl out with minor injuries and are released from the hospital that evening.; Monterrey, Mexico – A strong windstorm blows in. An overhead sign is blown down and a bus crashes into it, smashing the front window. 6 passengers onboard suffer minor injuries.; Santa Maria, CA – Midget car racing. Danny Sheridan gets nudged by Michael Smith and spins out of control towards the fence.; Hutchinson, KS – A pickup truck smashes into a convenience store and hits a customer, injuring her. The police said the accident was caused by a mechanical failure in the truck.
47	October 2009	Madrid, Spain – The Windsor Tower catches fire and firemen struggle to put it out. An hour and a half later, the east edifice collapses. The fire was not contained until dawn. The building was gutted and had to be demolished. It cost $28 million.; Rome, GA – A tower crane collapses onto a car driven by Patricia Ross. She survives.; Red Bluff, CA – Jerry Davis's speedboat catches too much air and nosedives. Due to the protective safety capsule, Jerry's only injuries are a broken shoulder and minor cuts and he soon returns to racing 4 months later.; Alicante and Xàbia, Spain – Torrential rains bring heavy floods that destroys the 100 year old Beniarbeig Bridge. The flood also pushed several boats into a low bridge, wrecking them.; Atco Dragway, NJ – Tommy "Trubble" McTague jumps on cars but then bounces off the cars and lands upside-down pass the cars.; USS Ranger 1991 – An F-14 Tomcat jet falls into the sea while landing after the arresting wire snaps. The pilots eject.; Guadalajara, Mexico – Stunt rider Caleb Moore attempts a risky ATV backflip. He under-rotates and lands upside down and is crushed by his ATV. The tumbling ATV barely misses a track worker. He has a concussion and a gash on his shoulder.; Buckeye, AZ – A man steals a Corvette and police chase him. He dodges two 18-wheelers, but then loses control and smashes into another 18-wheeler. The driver is ejected from the car, but only has cuts and bruises and is arrested.
48	October 2009	Lake Traunsee, Austria – During a powerboat race, an Australian speedboat driven by Peter McGrath and Bill Barry Carter hits turbulence, gets air and barrels rolls down the lake.; Phoenix, AZ – When the Valley Metro Rail was installed, the drivers are not accustomed to sharing the road with the Light Rail, resulting in a series of accidents. One day, Brandon Stoville and his girlfriend are moving when their pickup truck is hit at a crossing, sending pieces of furniture flying.; Queensland, Australia – Brian Marsden's dragster wipes out and smashes into his opponent, Mark Ballard. The force pushes Mark's car partially over the barrier, nearly striking a cameraman. Brian is unhurt and rebuilds his car in 3 years while Mark has severe bruises and can only save the engine.; Lima, Peru – A paint factory full of volatile chemicals explodes in massive fireballs that are 13 stories high.; Vail Pass, Colorado – Cody Schmidt tries a snowmobile jump but falls off mid way. He breaks his back in 5 different places.; St. Louis, MO – A brand new F-4 stalls and crashes on the runway. A technician had left a riveting tool inside the jet, which jammed the controls.; Oceano, CA – Motocross stunt jumper Tracey Monterone crashes trying to avoid a cameraman in his landing spot.; Aurora, NE – Arsonist/s set fire to the Fidelity Building. The building collapses from the fire.
49	October 22, 2009	Wichita, KS – At about 12:37 am at night, an irate citizen suddenly crashes into the Wichita City Hall with his car. Shocked officers chase on foot, while the car drives through the elevator lobby then destroys the X-ray machine. He finally crashes into a car park wall at the end. The man was angry after an earlier incident when the officers told him to turn down the music in his car. To prevent it from happening again, they put concrete blocks around the property.; Hemel Hempstead, England – The Buncefield fire.; Freestyle motocross rider Nate Adams lands upside down attempting to do his first backflip, suffering a concussion, broken collarbone, and dislocated shoulder. Nate still completes in FMX events today.; San Antonio, TX – The San Antonio bus line becomes the scene of multiple accidents. First, a bus driver texts while driving and crashes into an SUV. Then, two buses are travelling at high speed. Suddenly, the bus in front stops and the bus behind crashes into the front bus, sending passengers flying.; Western Sydney International Dragway, Sydney, Australia – Darren Morgan is racing his top fuel dragster when it loses the left wheel and hit the wall. Darren is OK.; Edmonton, Canada – Greg Whitlow rides Lights Out the bull. Lights Out spins recklessly and Greg takes a hit to the head and is knocked out cold. Lights Out continues to trample Greg for a minute until wranglers get it back. Greg spends six months in the hospital with severe head injuries and retires.; Bilbao, Spain – A van packed with over 220 pounds of explosives by a terrorist group explodes next to a TV station. The only injury is a station employee with ear damage.; Winter Haven, Florida – F1 Boat Racing on Cypress Gardens Lake. It is the last heat before the finals. Mike Seebold's boat catches a gust of wind, sharply veers left, and smashes into the water. He's uninjured, makes repairs to the boat, and races in it the next day.
50	November 5, 2009	Persian Gulf, off the coast of Doha, Qatar – Boat driver Sheikh Hassan and his throttleman Matteo Nicolini, are racing in The Spirit of Qatar speedboat when it flips and crashes. The boat's wake nearly causes the 77 boat from Australia to flip as well. Sheikh has a neck injury while Matteo's unscathed.; Querétaro, Salamanca and Guanajuato, Mexico May 7, 2007 – The Popular Revolutionary Army or EPR bomb gas pipelines owned by Pemex, Mexico's state-owned natural gas company as a response to the government keeping Mexico in poverty. It keeps burning and exploding for 2 days, about 1200 companies are affected, but thankfully, no one is injured.; Louisville, KY – Jeremy Stenberg is at a stunt show when, during a backflip, he falls off his bike midway and lands hard on both feet. He severely breaks both legs, but recovers after 4 months and is back riding.; Villa Martelli, Argentina – A chemical factory catches fire. The explosions occur mere feet from firefighters. Injuries are minimal.; Kuala Lumpur, Malaysia – The annual base jump event. Pierre Pascal's parachute opens backwards and he collides with the Petronas Towers. He survives, but retires from jumping.; Famoso Raceway, Bakersfield, CA – Dan Horan comes out of a 5-year retirement and collides with Mike Chrisman's dragster. Dan is knocked out, hitting the wall several times. He suffers a fractured vertebrae, broken ribs and concussion. He retires again. Mike is bruised, but unhurt.; Lake Hood Seaplane Base, Anchorage, Alaska – A de Havilland Beaver – with a family and dog onboard – crashes after taking off just feet from amateur cameraman Dustin Koehler.; Puerto Vallarta, Mexico – Hurricane Kenna wreaks havoc on the western coast of Mexico. While documenting the hurricane's fury, Reporter Geoff Mackley is nearly crushed by a collapsing floor of a building he's taking shelter under.
51	November 2009	Buenos Aires, Argentina – A gas station explodes in massive fireballs.; Ennis, MT – Police are in hot pursuit of killer George Harold Davis. Davis attempts to stall the police by braking in front of the police car and delivering gunshots while the car stops. Eventually, his car is stopped by a spike strip and tries to get more gunshots in as the police rams into his car at high speeds. Too injured to continue, the police subdue Davis. Two officers are injured in the shootout.; Atco Dragway, NJ – Robbie Knievel jumps, lands hard and is launched from the motorcycle. He separates his collarbone, and breaks his ankle.; Emmeloord, Netherlands – Jan Van Der Marel and his daughter's rally car wipes out and crashes into a ditch. Both are uninjured.; San Francisco, CA – A warehouse catches fire and firemen come to put it out. Then, a burning wall collapses on a fireman. Luckily, he wasn't killed. Because of the quick response, the fireman suffers only a broken leg and second-degree burns on his arms.; Reno, NV – Dick Sugden's drag boat smashes into the shore at 160 mph. He jumps from the boat into the water at the last second, sustaining serious injuries to both his legs.; Vigo, Spain – A German helicopter performs maneuvers for the audience, but while they swoop down for a trick, they miscalculate their altitude and smash into the sea. Both pilots are rescued, but the helicopter is completely destroyed.; Red Deer, Alberta, Canada – Two motorcycle riders attempt to perform simultaneous wheelies. During the attempt, one motorcycle brakes, causing the other rider to smash into the motorcycle. The motorcycle and its rider cartwheels uncontrollably towards a power pole. The rider is rushed to the hospital with a broken collarbone.; Perak, Malaysia – The 1993 Pantai Remis landslide.
52	December 2009	Sydney, Australia – An enormous gas explosion unleashes a fireball 650 ft in the air.; Kalvesta, Kansas – A tornado bears down on a ranch and rips it to shreds.; Knightdale, NC – Martin Lunsford's ultralight runs out of power and crashes into the woods. He survives with 2 broken vertebrae, ribs, a fractured pelvis and a punctured lung.; Bristol, England – A F1 boat smashes into a wall, but driver Guido Cappellini survives.; Portland, Indiana – Hill Climb competition. A rock crawler attempts to scale a hill, but it falls, knocks out driver Bob Standage with his foot on the gas and races into the crowd and other cars. Neither Standage nor anyone in the crowd is hurt.; Taltal, Chile – A helicopter hits a radio antenna, blows a tail rotor, spins out of control, hits 2 empty homes and crashes onto an unoccupied car. The helicopter didn't explode and the pilots survive.; California desert – BMX riders jump 113 feet for a music video shoot and are pulled by a car in order to make the jump. Adam Strieby tries it out, but the car goes too fast, causing him to overshoot the ramp. Adam bails and lands feet first from 30 feet up. He sprained his ankle, fractured a leg and broke 8 vertebrae on his spine. His bike is a loss.; Braselton, GA – A series of crashes at the Road Atlanta Speedway. These accidents mainly occur at turn 10, known as "The Dip". In one particular race, Randy Canfield loses control and flips his convertible 8 times. A new owner removed "The Dip" and replaced it with a chicane in 1996 to prevent more accidents.
53	December 2009	Eichenbühl, Germany – Speed hill climbing. A race car wipes out and rips to shreds in a ditch before tumbling down the mountain. Two cameramen are nearly hit by debris. The driver, Herbert Stenger is alive, and the car is a $250,000 loss.; Santo Domingo, Dominican Republic – A propane explosion unleashes large mushroom clouds and a shockwave that breaks windows.; Kennewick, WA – Hydroplane racing. J. Michael Kelly reaches max speed, when his boat suddenly flies into the air and smashes into the water. He climbs out of the boat with no injuries and is back racing a week later.; Statesboro, GA – An SUV on the run from police hits an embankment and gets launched into the air, flipping 5 times, ejecting the driver, and lands on its side.; Lake Wolfgang, Austria – A freak accident where Walter Mika is flying his biplane when it crashes into a lake and cartwheels, nearly missing boaters. He only breaks a vertebra.; Brisbane, Australia – Seth Enslow lands hard on a jump and crashes into the barrier. He decides it will be his last jump.; Mission, British Columbia, Canada – A truck driver tries to beat a train, but the truck is smashed violently by the train instead.; Salt Lake City, UT – During a demolition, a chunk of building falls on the digger attempting to demolish it with an I-beam. The operator survives with only a cut to his and bruised ribs. The digger's boom and the I-beam shielded him from the debris.
54	January 2010	Aurora, NE June 17, 2009 – A massive tornado rips apart a Nebraska factory and sends storm chasers running for their lives.; Hamburg, Germany 1989 – A warehouse storing paraffin wax is engulfed in flames. Concerns arise that the warehouse storing turpentine barrels next door will explode if the temperature gets too high. Eventually, the turpentine explodes. In the aftermath, it takes weeks to clear the wax on the streets, the cause of the fire was an arson, and no one is injured.; Cerritos, CA – Robbie Knievel attempts a 100-foot jump, but when he lands, he is thrown over the bars and slides down the road on his back.; San Diego, CA – While making a turn, Chip Hanauer's red speedboat suddenly flies into the air and crashes, breaking a few of his ribs.; El Toro, CA – Rhys Millen attempts to complete a backflip with a truck on New Year's Eve, but he lands upside down and smashes his truck. He broke his back and suffered a fractured neck vertebra. He has managed to recover and successfully perform the stunt.; Perth, Australia – A gas station catches fire and explodes near bystanders. No one is killed.; Norway – During a snowmobile race, rider Bjorn Terje Heggeli tries a jump, but goes too fast and crashes. Heggeli has a broken shoulder blade. He returns to racing the next season, but retires 3 years later after crashing again.; San Bernardino, California – At the El Mirage dry lake, an experimental helicopter crashes nose up after the engine stopped working. The pilot only has back pain and bruises, while the helicopter is a total loss.
55	January 2010	Glendale, CA – A Bakery is hit by a woman who accidentally smashes her SUV into the store. It destroys much of the interior. Five years earlier, the same bakery gets plowed by a car, knocking two customers into the counter.; Lisbon, Portugal – A 100-year-old building is eroding. Everyone is evacuated, then the entire building collapses in a heap of rubble.; Crested Butte, CO – The first ever Winter X Games. During a snowmobile race, rider Dave Brown crushes racer Jason Jones, causing a severed arm muscle, dislocated shoulder and crushed sternum.; Vaison-la-Romaine, France – A heavy flood washes away historic buildings.; Jefferson, MD – During a hill climb competition, David Price flies off his motorbike mid jump and suffers a cracked rib.; Oslo, Norway – Base jumping event at the Radisson Blu Plaza hotel. A base jumper pulls his chute, but wind blows him off course, and his chute gets snagged on a lamppost. The chute snaps and he falls onto the concrete pavement. He survives with serious injuries to his chest and head. The hotel later bans base jumping.; Butte, Montana – On Evel Knievel Day, Spanky Spangler attempts to jump 200 feet. He races up the ramp with his car, then comes up short of the landing ramp, crashing nose-first. Spanky is pulled out with a slight concussion and speaks to the crowd.; Cape Canaveral, FL – The Juno II rocket prepares for liftoff. During the launch, the guidance system malfunctions, causing the rocket to veer off course, self-destruct, and explode in a massive fireball feet from the launch pad.
56	2010	Calpe, Spain – A small town near the Atlantic Coast is battered by a massive flood sweeping away everything in its path. Resident Jose Manuel Marquez films as 20 cars are carried away and packed tightly against each other, damaging storefronts.; Curitiba, Brazil – A chemical plant explodes, sending canisters flying hundreds of feet through the air.; Lake Elsinore, CA – Rodrigo Ampudia survives a nasty barrel roll in his off-road truck during a race. He sped into a jump and caught too much air.; San Diego, California – A car smashes into an office when the driver accidentally stepped on the gas instead of the brake.; Fontana, CA – A motorcycle race. Peter Bilicki records the race and Louis Asher, who was in front of him, wipes out. He rolls across the track and takes a direct hit from Peter's bike due to target fixation. Louis is seriously injured and retires.; Hiawatha, KS – A tornado comes down and sends debris flying.; Marble Falls, TX – Two-time speedboat champion Don Bausher wins a race but his boat goes out of control and rips apart. He's taken to shore and is released uninjured.; Cape Canaveral, FL – The Atlas-Centaur rocket falls back onto the launchpad and explodes in one of the biggest rocket explosions in history.
57	2010	Heber City, UT – 400 pounds of snowmobile slam down on Steve Medrano's head as he attempts a dangerous backflip. He survives with a gash to his face, 2 fracture vertebrae and a severe concussion. Steve now only rides snowmobiles recreationally.; Zephyrhills, FL – Skydiver David "TK" Hayes tumbles across a pond when he comes in too fast. He survives with two broken vertebrae in his neck and returns to compete in the sport again.; Brands Hatch Circuit, West Kingsdown, England – Chris Martin takes a nasty wipeout during a motorcycle race, crashing into the safety barrier. He survives with a broken ankle, vertebra and ribs.; Memphis, TN 1979 – Multiple barrels of parathion insecticide explode, spewing a cloud of toxic gas that threatens the city. 231 people need treatment, but no one dies, mainly because winds fan the cloud away from populated areas.; Wiltshire, England – Rival racers Peter Chambers and Godfrey Jones crash into a dirt barrier. The only injury suffered is a sore neck from Chambers.; Tri-Cities, WA – The 2006 Hydroplane Atomic cup. Dave Villwock drives a Miss Elam Plus speedboat that flips and slams into the water. Dave and his crew repair the boat and win the championship.; Broadbottom, England 2005 – Comp safari racing with the Northern Off Road Club (NORC). An orange land off-road rover, driven by Dave Brown and his navigator, tries a jump, catches too much air and barrel rolls 7 times across the hill. Dave is unhurt, and his navigator only has a bruised knee.; La Paz, Bolivia – 2 weeks of heavy rain erodes a hillside, and causes multiple houses to collapse. The area is declared a "disaster zone".
58	2010	Laurium, Greece – A fire breaks out at a plant storing volatile chemicals. The tanks are sent flying like rockets. Fortunately, only one man is injured and no one is killed.; Tapachula, Mexico – Hurricane Stan unleashes a wave of destruction on the community with massive floods that tear up houses, trees and bridges.; UT – BMX rider Josh Bender jumps off a 50-foot cliff. He lets go of his bike and slams into the ground, shattering his right ankle and breaking a vertebra. Josh is jumping again 1 year later.; San Juan, Argentina – During Turismo Carretera, Ernesto Bessone loses control and runs straight into a wall. The car then barrel rolls eight times with the driver trapped inside. Ernesto frees himself and he is taken to a hospital and released with no injuries. Bessone believes his heavy-duty race car seat and chassis saved his life during the accident.; Chandler, AZ – Michelle Updegraff is racing in her dragboat, but loses control from the get-go and the boat shatters into pieces. She is fished out with several broken ribs, scrapes, and bruises. Michelle later retires from racing due to financial problems.; Wilmette, IL – A car crashes into a restaurant injuring 9 people after the driver accidentally hits the gas instead of the brakes.; Monroe County, MI – Paul Sagehorn's motorcycle stunt goes wrong when he goes too slow and hits the landing ramp, flipping him over his bike and landing hard onto the ground. He breaks his pelvis in two places and suffers fractures to his foot and tailbone. He successfully made the same jump 9 months later.; Aircraft carrier – A Lockheed S-3A Viking prepares for take off, but the capult system isn't at the right pressure, causing the plane to roll slowly off the end the carrier. The four crew members manage to eject out of the plane.
59	2010	Punta Gorda, FL – Hurricane Charley wreaks havoc in the neighbourhoods, and storm chasers Jim Reed and Greg Zamarippa are caught in the hurricane. They film houses getting ripped apart by the massive winds and part of a shed barely misses Jim, while Greg decides to hide under their car. Damages from the hurricane totalled $16 billion.; Buenos Aires, Argentina – A paint factory containing acetone, xylene and turpentine is ablaze. Firefighters continue to douse the flames when the barrels explode. The burning chemicals spill out onto the streets. It takes more than 3 hours to put the fire out, 23 are injured.; Crandon, WI – An off-road race. Mike Jenkins loses control and crashes into a fence and 5 other drivers are thrown off-guard, resulting in a massive pile-up. All drivers are unscathed.; Anne Arundel County, MD – Cameraman Ben Smolen tags along with a group of friends going to Travis Pastrana's stunt park compound for Nitro Circus filming. Among the ramps and rides was a backflipping foam pit named "No Right Turn". Smolen decides to give it a try and successfully executes a backflip. He tries again but he misses the pit and smacks his head on a bulldozer. He suffers a fractured femur, fibual and tibual, two collapsed lungs and deep cuts in his chin. He makes a full recovery.; Angel Fire, NM – During the first Winter X Games, modified snow shovel racing was introduced. In the quarter-finals, veteran racer John Strader raced against Eric Oliver. The race starts, and Strader goes off-course, crashes into an embankment and flips 360 degrees 8 times. He broke his jaw, back and leg, cracked his sternum and bruised his heart, but recovers. Shovel racing is discontinued for the Winter X Games.; San Dimas, CA – Dexter Tuttle's speedboat disintegrates at high speeds and he is thrown like a ragdoll across the water.; Shakopee, Minnesota – A snowmobile race. Racer Bobby LePage is crushed by fellow racer Ross Martin. He survives. After spending 57 days in the hospital with a brain hemorrhage, four broken vertebrae, three ribs and his left hand, he returns to racing. Bobby later wins at the same track of his accident.; A series of accidents involving fighter jets on aircraft carriers which led to aircraft carriers being made safer.
60	2010	Queensland Raceway, Queensland, Australia – The 2005 Australian Carrera Cup Championship. Racers drive with modified Porsche 911s. On lap two, Cameron McLean attempts to advance from 4th place and collides with Rodney Jane, who was in front of him. McLean's car is sent barrel-rolling across the grass nearly 8 times. Although the car is heavily damaged, McLean walks away.; Khanty-Mansiysk, Russia – A lightning strike causes a massive oil refinery to catch fire. Firefighters try in vain to cool down the tanks. Suddenly, a massive explosion sends a shockwave that can be felt from dozens of miles away, knocking cameramen to the ground all over the neighbourhood. The fire keeps burning for 20 hours before it is contained. Damages are worth $40 million, 4 firefighters are killed and the plant is fined $200,000 for lapses in safety measures. The plant still operates.; Fort Worth, TX – A motocross freestyle competition. Thomas Pagès is behind in the leaderboard after a botched landing. In order to keep his place in the competition, he tries to execute the first-ever front flip, but he starts his rotation too slow. He lets go of his bime and lands upside down, nearly snapping his neck.; Valdez, Alaska – James Peyrous tries a jump on his snowmobile. Racing down the mountain, he jumps, but lands on a snow-covered log, which vaults him over the handbars, the snowmobile runs over him and flips 3 times. He had to drive himself to the hospital. He has a fractured L-2 and 3 vertebrae, a concussion and a gash on his face.; Parker Strip, Colorado River – A speedboat goes out of control at high speeds and crashes, throwing driver Henry Hilbrett and passenger James Mayer out. Both survive with only minor bruises.; Almuñécar, Spain – A downpour causes a flood that ravages the town. A wall protecting a carpark from the flood gives way and water floods the carpark.; Ciudad Valles, Mexico – A Brazilian bull rider is thrown around by a bull twice.; Pine Bluff, Arkansas – A car crashes into a grocery store when the driver accidentally stepped on the gas pedal instead of the brake. A woman resting on a bench near the window is hit by the car, dragging her 30 feet underneath the wheels. Another woman is crushed between the car and the counter. The two women were sent to the hospital and survive. The driver is cited for failing to control her vehicle.
61	2010	Taitung County, Taiwan – Typhoon Morakot, the deadliest typhoon to ever strike Taiwan, leaves 673 dead and 26 missing. Massive flooding ravages the country and the Jinshuai Hotel topples and falls into the rushing river. Luckily, no one was inside the hotel when it collapsed.; Albuquerque, NM – A sudden gust of wind blows a hot air balloon into the roof of a tent. The balloon hits the roof and a 70-year-old passenger falls 25 feet to the ground. Without the weight of the man, the balloon rises. The pilot deflates the balloon to bring it in for a crash landing. The passenger survives with a dislocated hip and a concussion, while the pilot only has a minor leg injury from the hard landing.; Valencia, Spain – The annual Las Fallas festival is underway, where residents burn statues made out of wood. While trying to ignite a statue named "Euro Kung-Fusion", it explodes, sending wooden planks flying towards the crowd. They used too much gasoline. Luckily, no one was injured.; Monte Carlo, Monaco – A Ferrari F50 is on a showcase drive when it starts raining. The car loses control, runs over a female track worker, and crashes into a store front. The woman was okay, and the Ferrari wasn't heavily damaged.; Jacksonville, FL – At Peacock's Tattoo parlor, employee Sean Beaucom is talking with a friend on a couch, when a minivan crashes through the store and hits the couch which sends the men flying off. Sean suffers a compression to his spine while his friend has bruises. 10 months later, Sean is sitting outside the parlor when another car crashes into the parlor and narrowly misses Sean, who jumps out of the way just in time. To prevent future accidents, bollards are put up at the front of the parlour.; British Columbia, Canada – A chemical facility in Fort St. John explodes in massive fireballs.; Dansville, NY – The Poags Hole Hill Climb competition. Matt Luna comes up with a green bike, gets off to a fast start, but accidentally launches his bike into the crowd. The bike tumbles, hits an umbrella and strikes a track worker in the head. Luckily, he only has a concussion and cut on his forehead and no one else was hurt.; Cape Canaveral, FL – The SM-65C Atlas prototype missile prepares for launch. A valve malfunction resulted in a loss of tank pressure, causing the entire rocket to explode on the launch pad. This was the only time the launch of the SM-65C Atlas was a total failure.
62	2010	Kitzbühel, Austria – A ski competition on one of the world's most notorious ski runs. Todd Brooker comes up with a practice run. During the run, one of Todd's skis shears off, causing him to tumble down the hill at high speeds. He is unconscious and severely injured, but lives. The accident ended his career.; Volusia County, FL – Stock car racing. Tim Senic makes a mad dash for the lead, but he hits a guardrail and his car flies off the track and lands upside down. He crawls out unscathed.; Los Angeles, CA – The 2007 X Games XIII. Jake Brown comes up for Skateboarding Big Air. He does a 720, but for his final jump, he loses his board and falls 45 feet to the hardwood floor. He is helped up and he walks away. Jake later wins the gold metal.; Bakersfield, CA – Randy Monte races in a dragboat when it flips over. His parachute activates and he is thrown from his boat. The boat then seemingly crushes him. Randy soon resurfaces, suffering multiple cracked ribs and a broken shoulder. He retires after the accident and now repairs motorcycles for a living.; Voronezh, Russia – A fireworks factory explodes, generating shockwaves that are felt from two miles away.; Berlin, Germany – A test where a propane tanker is intentionally set on fire to see how long it takes to explode. It later explodes sending shrapnel flying miles through the air.; Grand Canyon, AZ – Robbie Knievel tries to set a world record by jumping over The Grand Canyon. He succeeds, but his landing goes bust and he tumbles across the dirt. He suffers a severely sprained ankle and 3 broken ribs. Despite the accident, he's still given the record.; New Delhi, India – A bridge collapsed on a metro site and a steel girder hangs precariously. Four cranes are brought in to remove the girder, but all but one of the cranes topple and collapse. Though 6 people are hurt, miraculously, no one was killed.
63	2010	NRG Stadium, Houston, TX – Stuntman Mark Hager attempts to set a new world record for a car jump but comes up short and lands upside down. He walks away.; Xàbia, Spain – A waterspout makes landfall and a local restaurant is hit by the full force of the tornado. 4 are hurt, and damages to the restaurant are $132,000.; Assen, Netherlands June 29, 1985 – Round 3 of the 1985 Sidecar World Championship. Steve Webster and Tony Hewitt are in first place when in turn 4, the cold track causes their tyres to lose traction and the sidecar to jerk to the right. They crash into a ditch and the sidecar bounces with Webster still inside. Hewitt is ejected from his seat. Both riders are taken to the hospital and proceed to win the next 3 Sidecar World Championships.; A series of bus accidents. First, in Albuquerque, NM, an SUV turns in front of a bus, forcing the driver to ram into a light post and a bridge support beam. Then in San Antonio, TX, an SUV running a red light smashes into another bus, causing the bus to lose control and slam into a fire hydrant and a telephone pole. And then, in Long Island, NY, a truck crossing lanes pins a car into the center divider and then both are hit by a bus.; Lima, Peru – A fire breaks out at a shoe store. Firemen struggle to put it out, then a backdraft explosion injures them.; El Colegio, Colombia – a torrential rainstorm in one of the world's most geologically unstable locations triggers a violent landslide that tears up houses.; Vernon, NY – A sprint car race. A collision sends two sprint cars cartwheeling uncontrollably down the track, and one smashes into the flag stand, with two men inside the stand managing to jump down in time.; United States and Soviet Union – A series of rocket crashes and explosions during the Space Race.
64	2010	Eugene, OR – A Mac Store is open and customers are going about their day. When an employee is trying to reboot a system near the door, a driver who mistook the gas for the brake plows through the store. The employee is feared dead, but a window pane from the impact pushed her away from the car. More than $10,000 worth of merchandise is destroyed.; Aigio, Greece – A tanker truck filled with hexane catches fire on a highway. A BLEVE explosion sends a fireball high into the air and sends a man too close to the fire running for safety.; Perth, Australia – The 2004 Australian Formula Ford Championship. Bryce Washington slows down due to a caution flag, but the racer behind him doesn't, rear-ends Bryce and sends him into the wall. Josh McCowan speeds over the hill after Bryce's crash, and when he tries to avoid other cars, he loses control and brutally slams into Bryce's wrecked car. Josh's car avoids Bryce's head by inches. Both drivers are able to walk away.; Skagway, Alaska – Snowmobile rider Jason Adams jumps a gaping ravine, but he lands very hard and spins. He splits open his chin, shatters his jaw, and loses 18 teeth. Jason spent several weeks in the hospital and vows never to ride a snowmobile again. He now sells snowmobiles and teaches others how to operate them.; Auburn, CA – A dirt bike race. Bobby "the blaze" Hedden wipes out on a turn and jams his bike's throttle. His bike goes out of control, speeds across the center of the track, jumps the barricade, and crashes into the spectators. No one was hurt.; Mexico City, Mexico – A bull-riding competition. Rider Javier Diaz gets off to a good start, but after 8 seconds the bull lifts the fence separating the arena from the spectators with its horns. Javier bails, and the bull takes dead aim at the crowd. Most make it to safety, but some stragglers are hurt by the bull before it is brought back by wranglers after 90 seconds of ramaging.; Byron, IL – Rob Lacroix, the self-proclaimed "King of Wheelies" because of his wheelies with a drag car, tries to perform a wheelie on a track. The drag car flips and lands upside down. Rob crawls out. The track was slippery due to a recent rainstorm and the engine was too powerful, causing his accident.; Beartooth Mountains, MT – A raging wildfire has Ron Michaelson and his friend trapped and has blocked all possible means of escape. As the wildfire slowly closes in on them, they decide to release their horses. Ron signs off as he proceeds to run for cover. The next morning, the two campers have survived the fire by hiding in a creek with some wet blankets. Their horses have returned singed, but not hurt. Not a single tree was left standing in their campsite – more than 30 acres were burned down.
