= Seth Enslow =

American motorcycle racer (b. 1975)

Seth Enslow, athlete
- Born: Seth Enslow; January 22, 1975 (age 51); California, United States
- Other name: Sethro
- Years active: 1995–present
- Children: Cialee Enslow

Seth Enslow (born January 22, 1975) is an American motorcyclist and stunt performer most notorious for his big jumps and equally big crashes.

== Career ==
=== Rise to motorcycle fame ===
When he was sixteen, Enslow bought his first dirtbike and started to race as an amateur in New York and Florida. In 1993, after graduating from Wellsboro High School in Pennsylvania, he moved to California. It was there that he met up with Dana Nicholson who had just founded Fleshwound Films with fellow filmmakers Jon and Cami Freeman. In 1994, they released their first film Crusty Demons of Dirt showcasing the underground motocross movement out in the deserts and badlands in the United States. The film gave Enslow notoriety for overjumping a sand dune and crashing hard. The distance he traveled was never measured but it is speculated to be around 200 to 250 feet (61 to 76 m). The movie quickly spawned a sequel and, once again, Enslow made an impact by coming up short on a jump and landing on supercross racer Jeremy McGrath's practice bike. This notoriety made Enslow one of the first bike riders to receive sponsors without having a racing career.

Enslow, who by this time was making a living riding bikes, decided to break the world record of 251 feet (77 m) set by Doug Danger. He started practicing by jumping ramp jumps over kegs of beer, cars, motorcycle and other big objects at different events. In 1999, he broke Robbie Knievel's (son of Evel Knievel) 226 feet (69 m) record for most motorcycle jumps. However, Enslow's triple clamps broke, which disconnected his front end from the frame, resulting in Enslow diving head first into the asphalt. But Enslow was soon on his feet and even signing autographs before leaving the venue.

=== First record attempt ===
In 1999, Enslow made his first attempt to break the overall record at fellow motocross rider Mike Cinqmars' property with a ramp designed by Johnny Airtime of Air Time Association. Enslow was riding a customized Service Honda, which is basically a Honda 250 dirt bike with a 500cc two stroke engine. Enslow started jumping 120-foot (37 m) jumps and gradually pulled the ramp back, finishing with a 240-foot (73 m) jump before calling it a day due to increasing winds.

The next day, the wind was still blowing but it was a tailwind and would not risk pushing Enslow sideways. So, jumping continued with the first jump to be around 220 to 230 feet (67 to 70 m). However, the tail wind was stronger than anticipated and pushed Enslow beyond his landing ramp where he traveled 245 feet (75 m). The flat landing caused Enslow to hit his head on the handlebars which crushed his skull above his right eye. Enslow fell off his bike and paramedics rushed to his aid. An emergency helicopter lifted him to a nearby hospital where the doctors cut him ear to ear, pulled his forehead down and inserted two titanium plates to replace the crushed part of his cranium.

Enslow was recommended by his doctors to not ride his bike for at least six months. However, Enslow ignored this, and four weeks later he broke the overall indoor world record with a 170-foot (52 m) jump at the Los Angeles Coliseum. This was all featured in his first own film release Seth - The Hard Way released in 2000.

=== Second record attempt ===
Enslow healed up and continued to shoot several films for Fleshwound Films and other companies and going for big jumps as well as being a featured rider on the Crusty Demons World Tour. In 2004, he released his second film named simply Seth II which showcased Enslow riding with his friends on several locations and also his second record attempt. The attempt was held at what riders usually called Manny's Yard, a location with several big jumps, the biggest measuring 200 feet (61 m). The venue was long from ideal and had a complicated runup to the ramp. This meant that as the ramp was pulled back further and further, Enslow struggled to get the speed he needed in order to clear the gap. This led to Enslow coming up short of the landing ramp and sending him flying through the air resulting in a broken leg and a concussion.

=== Night of Records 2006 ===
In 2006, Fleshwound Films organized 'The Night of Records Down Under' in Australia, an event which led to six new records being set in different categories in front of an audience of 22,000 people. Enslow was originally supposed to attempt to break the 250cc record, but had to back out after injuring himself at a practice session. Enslow then gave up his spot to his old friend Larry Linkogle who broke the record with a 255-foot (78 m) jump (which was also the overall record for a few hours before being broken by Trigger Gumm with a 277.5-foot (84.6 m) jump).

In 2007, Enslow appeared in the Discovery series Stunt Junkies where he jumped a Convair 880 passenger jet, a total distance close to 200 feet (61 m). After successfully jumping the plane, Enslow jumped it again, later being quoted as saying, "When would I get another chance to jump an airplane that big?"

=== Night of Records 2008 ===
Fleshwound Films once again held a record event in 2008 where several records were broken. Enslow was able to participate and set a new personal best with a jump of 301 feet (92 m). However, this was far from close to breaking the record since it had been bettered by both Robbie Maddison and Ryan Capes. Nevertheless, Enslow commented, "I am stoked. I may not have claimed the world record but I am really happy with my result. That is the best I have jumped." Enslow also says he no longer has any plans to try to break the overall record since the stakes are just too high, with the current record being set at 346 ft 4 in (105.56 m) set by Robbie Maddison.

=== World record Harley-Davidson jump 2010 ===
On 2 March 2010, Enslow managed a leap between ramps of 183.7 feet (56.0 m), easily beating Bubba Blackwell's previous world record of 157 feet (48 m) set in Las Vegas in 1999. The stunt took place at Barangaroo, on Sydney Harbour and is measured in feet because the previous records have been set in the United States. The death-defying stunt was seen by some as recreating an unforgettable Harley-Davidson benchmark set by Evel Knievel in 1975. However, the bike that Enslow rode was highly modified, and far exceeded the capabilities of any bike ever ridden by Knievel.

== Other activities ==
As Enslow got older, he looked for other businesses to branch into to be able to make a living with less risks involved. Seth is now a union worker, working daily on tractors and he also enjoys doing residential construction jobs. He tattoos occasionally and still loves to travel. Enslow lives in California with his girlfriend Alexandra and their co-parented children. On the weekends he rides his motorcycle and he enjoys his family and friends.

== Movie appearances ==
- Crusty Demons of Dirt
- Crusty Demons of Dirt 2
- Crusty Demons of Dirt 3
- Crusty Demons - God bless the freaks
- Crusty Demons - 2000 the Metal Millennium
- Crusty Demons - The next level
- Crusty Demons - The seventh mission
- Crusty Demons - The eight dimension
- Crusty Demons - Nine lives
- Crusty Demons - A Decade of Dirt
- Crusty Demons - Chaotic Chronicles of The Crusty Demons of Dirt
- Crusty Demons - The dirty dozen
- Crusty Demons - Unleash Hell
- Crusty Demons - Josh Anderson dirt to Dust
- Crusty Demons - Global Assault Tour
- Crusty Night of Records
- Seth - The Hard way
- Seth II
- Metal Mulisha World Domination
- Fresno Smooth
- Full Throttle Extreme
- Heaven and Hell on Earth
- Ryan Capes - My way to the record
- Motorcycle Mayhem X
- Bubba's flying 50 Freaks Circus 2
- Brian Deegan's Disposable Heroes
- All my crazy friends 2 - A more nuts
- Bilko vs. the Widow Maker
- Wrath Child
- Jeremy McGrath: Steel Roots

=== TV shows ===
- Destroyed in Seconds
