= 2007 Bocaue fire =

2007 fire and explosion in Bocaue, Bulacan

2007 Bocaue, Bulacan fire
- A still capture from the December 31, 2007, edition of GMA Network's 24 Oras shows store owners attempting to put out the fire when the fireworks exploded. This incident injured seven.
- Date: December 31, 2007
- Time: 10:00 a.m. to 11:00 a.m. (PST)
- Location: Governor F. Halili Avenue, Barangay Turo, Bocaue, Bulacan, Philippines; 14.806956°N 120.940684°E
- Injuries: 7 injured
- Missing: 4 missing (all recovered)

On the morning of December 31, 2007, ten fireworks stores began burning in Barangay Turo, Bocaue, Bulacan, Philippines, causing a series of explosions in the area. The fire lasted for almost an hour and caused several traffic jams on Fortunato F. Halili Avenue and the North Luzon Expressway.

== Background ==
Bocaue, a town in the Greater Manila Area, is well known in the Philippines for its pyrotechnics industry. However, this has also been the cause of large fires in the area, especially during traditional and widespread New Year use.

In 1988, an illegal fireworks factory exploded in Bocaue, leveling several houses and killing ten people. According to police, two barrels of powder ignited and "blew up" the neighborhood. An incident in 2004 resulted in eight deaths after a customer tested out a type of firecracker called higad near firecracker stalls.

The Philippine government has enacted several restrictions regarding the use of pyrotechnic devices such as fireworks. The Republic Act 7183 regulates "the manufacture, distribution, sale and use of" pyrotechnics and prohibits those which are not listed in the Act to ensure public safety. However, such regulations are rarely followed in practice and according to United Press International, usually remain unenforced by local authorities.

Child workers are also known to be heavily involved in the industry. According to annual surveillance data collected by the Philippines Department of Health (DOH), in pyrotechnics-related incidents between 2010 and 2014, 47% of victims were aged between five and fourteen.

== Location ==
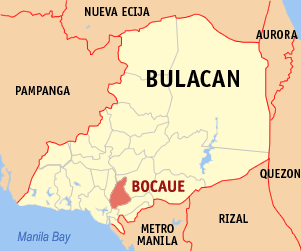
Map of the Municipality of Bocaue in Bulacan province where the fire occurred.

The fire occurred in Barangay Turo, Bocaue, Bulacan at the site where the stores, one beside the other, sell fireworks. Next to them is a Meralco electric substation, and a few meters away is the Bocaue Exit of the North Luzon Expressway with a gas station nearby.

== Causes ==
Unsafe fireworks testing and accidental fire caused by a lit cigarette were two of the potential causes seen by the investigators. The Bureau of Fire Protection believes that somebody lit a cigarette and accidentally threw it into a stack of fireworks at the back of a store. The Philippine National Police believes that it was caused by a chemical reaction. The fireworks testing theory was entertained as a probable cause but has since been rejected.

As of January 2, 2008, the cigarette theory is accepted as the cause of the fire.

== Events ==
A still capture from the December 31, 2007, edition of GMA Network's 24 Oras that shows people running to safety when the fireworks exploded in the streets.

Even before the fire, people noticed issues regarding the placement of the fireworks stores, notably that there were no gaps between the stores. Some warned the vendors about the danger in the event of a fire.

Coincidentally, a day before the fire, on the morning of December 30, 2007, the same area suffered a power blackout when a power post fuse exploded. This left several stores and houses without power.

On December 31, 2007, the firemen on duty in the area were transferred, leaving the area without protection in case of a major fire.

The incident occurred a day before the New Year. Every year, this part of the town becomes a marketplace for fireworks, attracting people from all over. The trading was at its peak when the fire occurred, and many people were present.

At 10:00 AM, the fire began with the ignition of a Judas Belt when a cigarette was thrown away, according to the authorities. It exploded, its sparks reaching a stack of fireworks from another store. Store owners attempted to put out the fire but an explosion rippled the stores entirely. In a few minutes, what appeared to be a small firework explosion, turned into a large, uncontrollable fire.

During the fire, motorists plying the North Luzon Expressway saw the smoke from the fire and even slowed down to see it.

People ran for safety to a nearby vacant lot, just behind passenger vans terminal servicing the route of Bocaue, Bulacan to SM City Pampanga in the City of San Fernando, Pampanga, causing a stampede. The explosion reached the street and broke some of the windows of nearby houses and establishments. Establishments across the road managed to quickly cover their glass windows and doors, preventing them from being shattered.

In a matter of minutes, the firemen arrived at the scene and before 11:00 AM the fire was put out.

== Casualties ==
The fire injured 7 people including two crewmen of GMA Network and the four people missing were later found. There were no fatalities. All of the stores burned, and the remaining fireworks were disposed of. A total of three vehicles were burned during the fire.

== Aftermath ==
Many people were dismayed by what happened. They believe that the lack of strict enforcement of local laws made this incident possible. They also believe that somebody should be liable for what happened since the fires and series of explosions shattered the glass windows around the area, causing injuries. Atty. Carlo Santiago, one of the witnesses, has filed a case against the store owners.

On January 2, 2008, the Bureau of Fire Protection was considering the revocation of the Bocaue store owner's permits, and the investigators drew up a list of possible "suspects", refusing to name them while the investigation was pending.

According to investigators, the store owner where the fire started will not be sued since everything happened accidentally. Investigation of the accident stalled due to the lack of witnesses.

The same area suffered a similar incident again on November 13, 2009, less than two years after the 2007 incident. The incident was recorded by residents near the area and several videos have been uploaded to YouTube.

== In popular culture ==
The fire is featured on an episode in the first season of the Discovery Channel program Destroyed in Seconds.
