= Spanky Spangler =

American actor

- Occupations: Film actor, stunt man
- Website: http://www.spankyarmy.com

Spanky Spangler (born November 4, 1947) is an American daredevil and theatrical stunt man who currently claims to hold the world record distance for a jump performed in an automobile at 328 feet (100 meters). The most common stunt that he performs is jumping off a platform or hot air balloon over 150 feet (46 m) in the air into an air bag on the ground. Another notable Spangler stunt is a successful jump over the Rio Grande in a rocket-powered truck.

Prior to becoming a stunt man, Spangler was a Green beret in the United States Army, claiming to be the youngest ever green beret. Spanky Spangler currently holds 23 World records and is a regular performer at Evel Knievel Days in Butte, Montana. He often works behind the scenes as a stunt coordinator for Robbie Knievel.
