= Atco Dragway =

Motorsport facility

Coordinates: 39.775°N 74.830°W

- Opened: 1959
- Closed: 2023
- Website: https://atcodragway.com/
- Surface: Paved
- Length: 0.250 mi (0.402 km)

Atco Dragway (originally Atco Raceway) was a 1/4 mile dragstrip located in the Atco section of Waterford Township, New Jersey. It closed suddenly on July 18, 2023.

== History ==
Opened in 1959, it was the oldest drag strip in New Jersey. The track was also sanctioned by the NHRA, the largest sanctioning body in drag racing.

== See also ==
- Old Bridge Township Raceway Park

== Notes ==
- Alan E. Brown. The History of America's Speedways: Past & Present, Comstock Park, Michigan: Brown, 2003, ISBN 0-931105-61-7, pp. 458
