= List of accidents and incidents involving the Tupolev Tu-134 =

The Tupolev Tu-134 has been involved in 76 hull-loss accidents for a total of 1387 fatalities.

== 1960s ==
14 January 1966
The second prototype Tu-134 (CCCP-45076) crashed near Chkalovsky Airport during trials with the NII VVS after entering a dive following a turn, killing all eight on board. This was the first fatal crash of a Tupolev Tu-134 and also the first hull loss of the aircraft.
7 October 1969
A Malév Hungarian Airlines Tu-134 (HA-LBC) with 53 people on board sustained substantial damage when landing at Amsterdam Airport Schiphol after the right hand landing gear retracted. There were no casualties, and the aircraft was repaired and returned to service. However, eight years later in September 1977 this aircraft was involved in another accident with a less fortunate outcome.
19 November 1969
A Malév Hungarian Airlines Tu-134 (HA-LBA) overran the runway on landing at Yesilköy Airport, collapsing the landing gear. There were no casualties, but on this occasion the aircraft was written off due to the damage incurred.

== 1970s ==
23 May 1971
Aviogenex Flight 130, a Tu-134A (YU-AHZ), landed hard and crashed at Rijeka Airport in bad weather, killing 78 of 83 on board.

16 September 1971
Malév Hungarian Airlines Flight 110, a Tu-134 (HA-LBD), crashed near Boryspil International Airport in fog, following two aborted approaches after generator failure forced the crew to switch to batteries, killing all 49 on board.

8 July 1972
An Aeroflot Tu-134 (CCCP-65604) burned out while parked at Murmansk Airport, when a bleaching agent spilled in the luggage compartment after the suitcase it was stored in was dropped.

17 July 1972
A GosNII GA (Gosudarstvenny Issledovatelny Institut Grazhdanskoi Aviatsii, State Research Institute of Civil Aviation) Tu-134A (CCCP-65607) ditched in the Moscow Channel near Sheremetyevo Airport after both engines failed due to fuel exhaustion when the crew had forgotten to turn on the transfer pumps in time; although the aircraft was salvaged, it was written off and used as a rescue trainer until it was broken up around 2001.

30 October 1972
An Interflug Tu-134 (DM-SCA) landed hard at Berlin Schönefeld Airport in bad weather and ran off the side of the runway; the aircraft was ferried to the Soviet Union but was not repaired and was written off instead.

30 June 1973
Aeroflot Flight 512, a Tu-134A (CCCP-65668), overran the runway on takeoff from Marka International Airport, Amman, Jordan, following an aborted takeoff when the pilot thought an engine had failed, killing two of 85 on board; seven on the ground also died when the aircraft struck a building. The aircraft was damaged beyond repair and written off.

1 September 1975
Interflug Flight 1107, a Tu-134 (DM-SCD), descended prematurely, struck the Locator Middle Marker radio mast at Leipzig/Halle Airport and crashed after the pilot failed to check descent rate during the approach, killing 27 of 34 on board; the crew subsequently received prison sentences.

2 January 1977
While landing at Prague Ruzyne Airport, CSA Flight 897, a Tu-134 (OK-CFD), collided with a CSA Ilyushin Il-18 (OK-NAA) that was taking off and veered off the runway; all 48 on board survived. The Tu-134 was written off, but the Il-18 was repaired and returned to service, flying until 1981. Prague Ruzyne airport is now known as Václav Havel Airport Prague.

2 April 1977
An Aviogenex Tu-134A (YU-AJS) crashed on landing at Libreville airport, Gabon, killing all eight people on board.

21 September 1977
Malév Flight 203, a Tu-134 (HA-LBC), struck level ground four miles southwest of Urziceni while on approach to Bucharest Otopeni Airport, killing 32 of 56 on board. The aircraft was being flown at reduced power and had a miscalibrated barometric altimeter, causing the crew to overestimate the aircraft's altitude.

22 November 1977
Interflug Flight 601, a Tu-134A (DM-SCM), landed hard at Schönefeld Airport after the pilot was unable to turn off the autopilot before landing; all 79 on board survived despite the substantial damage caused to the aircraft, which included the left wing being torn off.

16 March 1978
A Balkan Bulgarian Airlines Tu-134 (LZ-TUB) crashed near a small village (Gabare), approximately 10 miles (16 km) south of Byala Slatina, Bulgaria. On a flight from Sofia to Warsaw, the aircraft was climbing through 4,900 m (16,100 ft) but then started flying erratically, descending rapidly and crashing shortly afterwards, killing all 73 on board. The exact circumstances have not been made public. The crash remains the deadliest in Bulgaria.

30 August 1978
LOT Polish Airlines Flight 165 (1978), a Tu-134 (SP-LGC), was hijacked by two people from East Germany. Forced by the hijackers, the plane landed in Tempelhof Airport. No one was injured among the 69 occupants.

22 March 1979
An Aeroflot Tu-134A (CCCP-63501) on a cargo flight, struck trees and crashed while landing at night and in bad weather at Liepāja International Airport, Latvia, killing four of five crew. The accident was caused by a combination of factors including the weather conditions, poor visibility, and also because the aircraft was overloaded with cargo and the center of gravity was too far forward.

19 May 1979
An Aeroflot Tu-134A (CCCP-65839) landed at Ufa Airport, Bashkortostan, with the landing gear brakes on. The tyres failed together with the left main undercarriage, causing the aircraft to leave the runway. A fuel tank ruptured, and a fire broke out. The aircraft was written off, but there were no fatalities recorded and all 89 on board survived.

31 May 1979
An Aeroflot Tu-134A (CCCP-65649) burned out following a hydraulic system fire after a landing gear wheel blew due to overheating during a training flight; no casualties.

11 August 1979
Two Aeroflot Tu-134s (CCCP-65816 and CCCP-65735) collided in mid-air near Dniprodzerzhynsk (now Kamianske) because of ATC errors, killing all 178 on board both aircraft.

== 1980s ==
23 January 1980
A LOT Polish Airlines Tu-134 (SP-LGB, Wladyslaw Reymont) overran the runway on landing at Okecie airport (now known as Warsaw Chopin Airport); the aircraft was written off but no fatalities were recorded.

6 January 1981
An Aeroflot Tu-134B (CCCP-65698) was on a repositioning flight from Sukhumi Babushara Airport to Sochi when it left the runway on landing at Sochi following an unstable approach, and landing with brakes locked; the aircraft was written off but no fatalities were recorded.

28 June 1981
An Aeroflot Tu-134A (CCCP-65871) caught fire after a damaged tire failed and punctured a fuel tank while landing at Simferopol, Crimea, Ukraine. The aircraft had arrived from Kyiv Boryspil Airport where it had earlier performed a rejected takeoff, placing a heavy load on, and overheating, some of the tires. It then continued to Simferopol where at least one of the tires failed on landing. The aircraft was written off due to the resulting fire, but there are no details of persons on board or casualties.

17 June 1982
A Tu-134IK (CCCP-65687) operated by the Ministry of Radio Equipment Production as a flying ASW systems testbed crashed near Severomorsk-1 Naval Air Station after it struck a guy wire of a radio mast; of the 16 on board, only the pilot survived. The pilot ignored warnings from the GPWS, ATC and navigators that he was descending too fast.

14 August 1982
Aeroflot Flight 974, a Tu-134A (CCCP-65836), collided on the runway at Babusheri Airport, Abkhazia, Georgia, with an Aeroflot Let L-410M (CCCP-67191) operating as Flight G-73, killing all 11 on board the L-410; none of the 82 on board the Tu-134 were injured.

18 February 1983
A CSA Tu-134 was hijacked between Poprad and Prague, both at that time in Czechoslovakia, by a passenger who attacked a stewardess and attempted to enter the cockpit. He then threatened to blow up the aircraft. After refusing to surrender to security personnel on board, the hijacker was shot and later died of his injuries.

17 June 1983
An Aeroflot Tu-134A (CCCP-65657) encountered turbulence over Gali, Georgia en route to Yerevan, Armenia from Lvov (now Lviv), Ukraine; although the aircraft was able to land safely at Yerevan, it had suffered severe structural damage and was written off and used for fire tests during the investigation into the crash of Tu-134AK CCCP-65120 on 2 July 1986.

5 July 1983
While en route from Moscow to Tallinn, a passenger on board an Aeroflot aircraft, probably a Tu-134, told a flight attendant that a bomb was on board and his companion would detonate it unless they were flown to London or Oslo. The hijackers agreed to a refueling stop in Kotka, Finland, but the crew landed at Leningrad instead. When a hijacker realized they had been tricked, he shouted to the other to blow up the plane. Security guards boarded the plane, shooting and killing one hijacker and arresting the other.

30 August 1983
Aeroflot Flight 5463, a Tu-134A (CCCP-65129), struck the side of Dolan Mountain after the crew began descending too soon during the approach to Alma-Ata (now Almaty), Kazakhstan, killing all 90 on board.

18 November 1983
Shortly after taking off from Tbilisi, Georgia, Aeroflot Flight 6833, a Tu-134A (CCCP-65807), was hijacked by seven people attempting to flee the Soviet Union. The pilots performed sharp maneuvers to keep the hijackers off balance. The hijackers were forced out of the cockpit and instead of conceding to the hijackers demands, the pilot circled Tbilisi and later landed. On the following day, 19 November, the aircraft was stormed by Alpha Group who arrested the surviving hijackers, but the attack killed three passengers, two crew and two hijackers. The aircraft received 108 bullet holes during the attack and was written off due to airframe deformation during the maneuvers. Four of the hijackers received the death penalty and were shot on 3 October 1984; a female co-conspirator received a 14 year prison sentence.

10 January 1984
A Balkan Bulgarian Airlines Tu-134A (LZ-TUR) crashed short of the runway at Sofia Airport while attempting an overshoot after coming in too low, killing all 50 on board.

25 May 1984
Soviet Air Force Tu-134Sh2 02 lost control, broke up in mid-air and crashed near Donetsk, killing all seven on board. Two wires to the backup yaw damper had been connected backwards.

1984
An Aeroflot Tu-134A (CCCP-65095) burned out at ARZ-407 at Minsk-1 International Airport; no casualties.

1 February 1985
Aeroflot Flight 7841, a Tu-134AK (CCCP-65910), force-landed in a forest shortly after takeoff from Minsk-2 International Airport after both engines failed due to ice ingestion, killing 58 of 80 on board. The aircraft may have been improperly de-iced after sitting for seven days in below-zero temperatures.

3 May 1985
A mid-air collision involving Aeroflot Flight 8381, a Tu-134A (CCCP-65856), and a Soviet Air Force Antonov An-26 (identified both as CCCP-26492, and 101 red), occurred at FL130 near Zolochiv, in western Ukraine, because of ATC errors, killing all 94 on both aircraft.

22 June 1986
An Aeroflot Tu-134A (CCCP-65142) overran the runway at Penza Airport, 625 kilometers (388 mi) southeast of Moscow, following a late rejected takeoff due to low thrust and a spurious number two engine vibration warning. Unable to stop in time, the aircraft continued into a ravine and was written off; one passenger (of 59 on board) died of a heart attack.

2 July 1986
Aeroflot Flight 2306, a Tu-134AK (CCCP-65120), made a force-landing in a forest 80 km southwest of Syktyvkar, following an in-flight fire, killing 54 of 92 on board.

20 September 1986
While parked at Ufa, an Aeroflot Tu-134 was hijacked by two armed men fleeing from police; the hijackers opened fire as they attempted to seize the aircraft, killing two passengers before they themselves were shot and killed by security forces. The two men had allegedly killed two policemen who attempted to pursue them after they commandeered a taxi and forced the driver to take them to the airport.

19 October 1986
A Mozambique People's Republic Tu-134A-3 (C9-CAA) crashed near Mbuzini during a thunderstorm after the pilot ignored the GPWS, killing 34 of 44 on board, including Mozambican president Samora Machel. The crash remains the deadliest in South Africa.

20 October 1986
Aeroflot Flight 6502, a Tu-134A (CCCP-65766), landed hard, losing a wing and catching fire at Kuibyshev Airport after the pilot simulated a blind, instrument-only approach. This resulted in the deaths of 70 of 94 on board. The pilot subsequently received a 15 year prison sentence, later reduced to six years.

12 December 1986
Aeroflot Flight 892, a Tu-134A (CCCP-65795), struck trees and crashed near Berlin Schönefeld Airport while attempting to switch to runway 25L after performing an approach to runway 25R (which was closed for construction), killing 72 of 82 on board.

23 July 1987
An Aeroflot Tu-134A-3 (CCCP-65874) was damaged beyond repair and written off at Ivanovo Airport, located 247 kilometers (153 mi) northeast of Moscow. The aircraft was subsequently taken to Riga Airport in Latvia, and used for training purposes.

17 February 1988
A Vietnam Airlines Tu-134A (VN-A108) was written off at Noi Bai International Airport.

27 February 1988
Aeroflot Flight 7867, a Tu-134AK (CCCP-65675), crashed next to the runway at Surgut Airport because of crew errors while transitioning from an ILS approach to a visual landing, killing 20 of 51 on board.

11 October 1988
A ČSA Tu-134A (OK-AFB) was damaged beyond repair and written off following a hard landing at Prague. The aircraft was ferried to Piešťany Airport where it served as a snack bar for many years, but since 2014 it has been restored to classic ČSA OK Jet livery, and is now on display at a Dubnica nad Váhom airfield.

9 September 1988
Vietnam Airlines Flight 831, a Tu-134A (VN-A102), was approaching Don Muang Airport, Thailand, during a thunderstorm, when it crashed into a rice field 6km from the runway, killing 76 of 90 on board; the aircraft was possibly struck by lightning.

28 July 1989
Soviet Air Force Tu-134AK CCCP-65670 crashed short of the runway at Ulan-Ude Airport at night, broke apart and burned out; no casualties.

== 1990s ==
13 January 1990
Aeroflot Flight 6246, a Tu-134A (CCCP-65951), force-landed in a field near Pervouralsk following an in-flight fire, killing 27 of 71 on board; the fire was probably caused by an electrical short circuit.

12 January 1991
A Vietnam Airlines Tu-134AK (VN-A126) landed hard at Tan Son Nhat International Airport following a sudden loss of height; the aircraft was damaged beyond repair and written off, but all 79 on board survived.

24 January 1992
An Aeroflot Tu-134A (CCCP-65053) overran the runway on landing at Chorokh Airport, Georgia, collapsing the nosegear. There were no fatalities amongst the 57 on board, but the aircraft was written off. The runway had not been completely cleared of snow.

27 August 1992
Aeroflot Flight 2808, a Tu-134A (CCCP-65058), crashed on final approach 3 km (1.9 mi) short of Ivanovo Airport, because of ATC and crew errors, killing all 84 on board.

29 August 1992
An Aeroflot Tu-134A-3 (CCCP-65810) overran the runway at Kharkiv Airport, Ukraine, after landing too late; all 58 on board survived. The aircraft was written off and used for spare parts.

20-23 September 1993
1993 Sukhumi airliner attacks: On 20 September, Orbi Georgian Airways Tu-134A's 4L-65808 and 65809 were destroyed on the ground by Abkhaz small arms fire or missiles while parked at Babushara Airport with no casualties. On 21 September, Transair Georgia Tu-134A-3 65893 was shot down by a Strela 2 SAM missile during approach to Sukhumi and crashed in the Black Sea, killing all 27 (or 28) on board. On 23 September, passengers were boarding Transair Georgia Tu-134A CCCP-65001 when it was struck by rockets from an Abkhaz BM-21 Grad; the aircraft caught fire and burned out, killing a crew member; all 24 passengers escaped and survived.

22 February 1994
A Malév Hungarian Airlines Tu-134A-3 (HA-LBP) suffered a cockpit fire at Budapest - Ferihegy Airport, Hungary, during maintenance when a cleaning chemical caught fire, killing four technicians; the aircraft was parked at the airport and scrapped in 1995.

7 May 1994
An Aeroflot-Nord Tu-134A-3 (RA-65976) left the runway on landing at Arkhangelsk Airport after the right main landing gear failed to extend. The aircraft was damaged and written off, but all 62 on board survived. The shock strut inner cylinder cover on the right landing gear had broken, damaging hydraulic lines.

9 September 1994
A Tu-134AK (RA-65760) operated by the Gromov Flight Research Institute (LII) of the Ministry of Aviation Industry (MAP) was acting as a photographic chase aircraft to Tupolev Tu-22M3-LL 32 red when both aircraft collided over Samoyliha, Shatura District at 3,000 m (9,843 ft); the Tu-134 suffered severe damage to the stabilizer and it crashed out of control, killing all eight on board; the Tu-22 was able to land safely at Zhukovsky Airbase.

18 November 1994
During a training flight, the nosegear of a Malév Hungarian Airlines Tu-134A-3 (HA-LBK) failed to lower. The crew used an axe to cut a hole in the floor and forced the nosegear down. Although the aircraft landed safely, it was written off and used for spare parts before it was broken up in 1997.

30 November 1994
During the First Chechen War, five Tu-134As (one of Aeroflot and four of Stigl) were destroyed on the ground at Grozny Airport during an attack by six Russian Air Force Sukhoi Su-25s.

15 April 1995
An Imperial Air Tu-134A-3 (OB-1553) landed at Jorge Chavez International Airport, serving Lima, Peru, with the left gear retracted after a tire blew on takeoff from Cuzco's Velasco Astete Airport; all 73 on board survived. The aircraft was damaged and written off.

24 June 1995
A Komi Avia Tu-134A (RA-65617), operating for Harka Air Services, overran the runway on landing at Murtala Muhammed Airport, Lagos, Nigeria, after landing too late, killing 16 of 80 on board. The aircraft was destroyed and written off.

5 December 1995
Azerbaijan Airlines Flight A-56, a Tu-134B-3 (4K-65703), made a forced-landing shortly after take-off from Nakhichevan Airport, Azerbaijan, killing 52 of 82 on board. The number one engine failed, but the flight engineer reported in error that engine two had failed. The aircraft continued climbing on one engine until the pilot ordered engine two to be shut down by mistake. The second engine could not be restarted in time and a forced-landing was carried out.

16 November 1996
A Vietnam Airlines Tu-134B-3 (VN-A114) suffered landing gear collapse while taxiing at Da Nang Airport, Vietnam, injuring a crew member; the aircraft was reportedly written off.

3 September 1997
Vietnam Airlines Flight 815, a Tu-134B-3 (VN-A120), descended too low during the approach to Pochentong International Airport, Cambodia; despite warnings from the crew that the aircraft was too low, the pilot continued the approach. After descending to 100 feet, the pilot attempted to abort the approach, but it was too late; the aircraft struck several palm trees and crashed in rice fields short of the runway, killing 65 of 66 on board.

23 September 1999
A Vaynakavia Tu-134A (RA-65626) was destroyed in an air raid by two Sukhoi Su-25Ts while parked at Grozny Airport, Chechen Republic, during the Second Chechen War.

== 2000s ==
24 August 2004
As a result of a suicide bomber, Volga-Aviaexpress Flight 1353, a Tu-134A-3 (RA-65080), exploded in mid-air over Tula Oblast, 180 kilometres (110 mi) south of Moscow, and crashed near the village of Buchalki, killing all 44 on board.

10 July 2006
Russian Navy Tu-134 05 red, operating on behalf of the Black Sea Fleet Aviation unit (VVS ChF) and carrying Admiral Vladimir Masorin on an inspection trip to the Black Sea Fleet, overran the runway on takeoff from Gvardeyskoye Air Base following an aborted takeoff when the left engine failed and caught fire; all 20 on board survived, although three officers were injured. The engine failure was probably caused by a bird strike.

17 March 2007
UTair Flight 471, a Tu-134A-3 (RA-65021), landed short of the runway at Samara airport and broke apart, killing six of 57 on board.

26 March 2009
Russian Air Force Tu-134AK RA-65981 overran the runway at Sokol Air Base on the island of Sakhalin in the Russian Far East, during an aborted takeoff after encountering snow. The aircraft was substantially damaged and written-off, but no fatalities were reported.

== 2010s ==
20 June 2011
RusAir Flight 9605, a Tu-134A-3 (RA-65691) operating as RusLine Flight 243, crashed on the A-133 highway in fog at Besovets while on approach to Petrozavodsk, killing 47 of 52 on board. After the crash, Russia ordered all Tu-134s be removed from commercial service by 2012.

14 October 2011
Yamal Airlines Flight 16, a Tu-134A-3 (RA-65143), suffered an engine fire on takeoff from Novy Urengoy Airport, in the far north of Russia; the crew was able to circle around and perform an emergency landing with no casualties to the 74 on board. The aircraft was written off and used for airport rescue service training.

28 December 2011
Kyrgyzstan Air Company Flight 3, a Tu-134A-3 (EX-020), landed hard in dense fog at Osh Airport, Kyrgyzstan, breaking off the right wing and rolling over. A fire erupted but was quickly contained. All 88 on board survived.

== 2020s ==
12 October 2024
During the Russo-Ukrainian War, the Main Directorate of Intelligence of Ukraine claimed that it had destroyed a Tu-134 used to transport officials of the Russian defence ministry at an airbase in Orenburg Oblast.
