= Robbie Knievel =

American stunt performer (1962–2023)

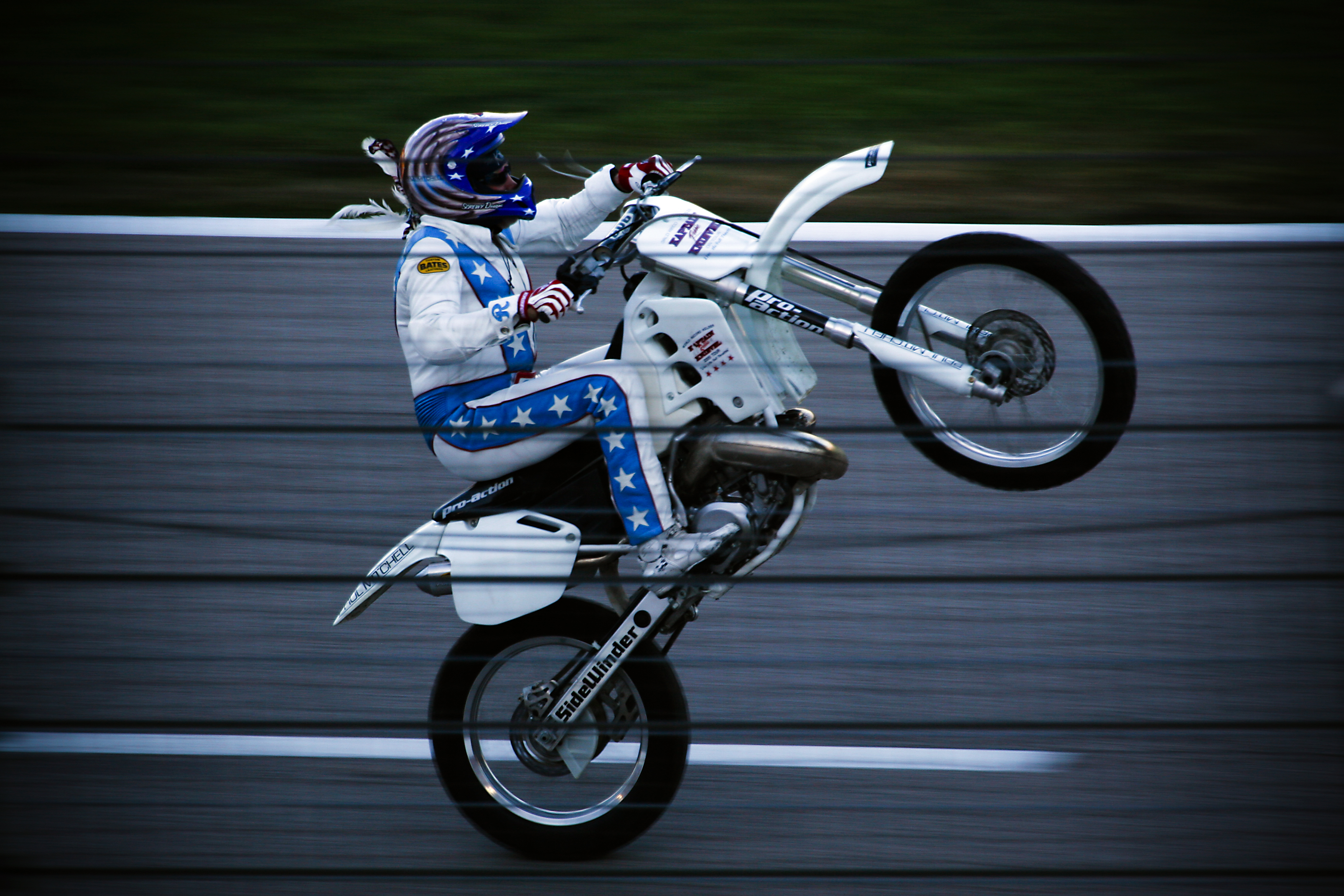
- Knievel performing a wheelie at Texas Motor Speedway in 2008
- Born: Robert Edward Knievel II; May 7, 1962; Butte, Montana, U.S.
- Died: January 13, 2023 (aged 60); Reno, Nevada, U.S.
- Resting place: Mountainview Cemetery, Butte, Montana, U.S.
- Occupation: Stunt performer
- Known for: Motorcycle jumping
- Children: 3
- Father: Evel Knievel
- Website: www.legendofknievel.com

Robert Edward Knievel II (May 7, 1962 – January 13, 2023) was an American motorcycle jumping stunt performer. He had also used the stage name Kaptain Robbie Knievel.

Knievel's last daredevil jump was in 2011, and he died in 2023 at age 60 of pancreatic cancer.

== Early life ==
Robbie Knievel was born on May 7, 1962, the son of stuntman Robert "Evel" Knievel and his first wife, Linda. He was the second of four children. Knievel began jumping his bicycle when he was four years old and learned how to ride motorcycles by the age of seven. He performed his first show with his father at Madison Square Garden when he was eight. On tour with his father when he was twelve, he would perform in the pre-jump shows. Knievel attended Central Catholic High School in Butte, Montana between 1975 and 1976, but never graduated. He wanted to lengthen his jumps, but his father disapproved. Knievel then went solo after his father's approval.

=== Comparisons with Evel Knievel ===
Knievel's jumping career was markedly different from his father's. Most notably, Knievel used Honda CR500 motocross bikes, whereas his father made most of his record-breaking jumps using a Harley-Davidson XR-750 motorcycle. The XR-750 is 90 pounds heavier, and the Honda is a motocross bike, whereas the Harley is a flat-track racing motorcycle. Robbie often replicated Evel's jumps, including Evel's 1967 Caesars Palace crash, except for two of his father's major accomplishments – a Harley-Davidson XR-750 jump and the Snake River Canyon jump using the Skycycle X-2. Although never attempted, Robbie stated that he wanted to use a Harley to clear a record-breaking 16 buses, three more buses than his father attempted at Wembley Stadium in 1975. Additionally, Robbie stated that he would attempt to re-create his father's 1974 failed rocket jump over the Snake River Canyon near Twin Falls, Idaho.

==== Leather jumpsuits ====
Knievel used red-white-and-blue V-shaped jumpsuits, similar to his father's famous white leather jumpsuit. Throughout his career, Robbie Knievel had three notable jumpsuit styles:

- A white jumpsuit with a red V lined with white stars used as a teenager touring with his father
- A white jumpsuit with a blue V lined with white stars and a removable cape used throughout his professional career
- A black jumpsuit with a white V lined with blue stars used in 2009 for the Las Vegas Mirage jump and promotional photos for the possible XR-750 Wembley jump.

A second black jumpsuit with a white V lined with red stars was used in promotional photographs in 2010 and 2011 but not used in a jump.

== Daredevil jumps ==
Knievel completed over 340 jumps, setting 20 world records.

=== Televised jumps ===
Several of Knievel's jumps were televised live, including the Caesars Palace jump, the building-to-building jump in Las Vegas, a jump over a moving train, a jump in front of the volcano at The Mirage hotel in Las Vegas, Nevada, and the Grand Canyon jump.

Televised jump	Air date	Details
Caesars Palace jump	April 14, 1989	To pay homage to his father, Knievel jumped the Caesars Palace fountains in 1989. The jump took place 22 years after Evel Knievel failed to land safely in 1967. Knievel landed safely and became the first to successfully jump the fountains. Following the jump, Knievel stated, "that was for you, Dad".
Daredevil Duel jump	July 10, 1993	In 1993, Knievel challenged British motorcycle stuntman Eddie Kidd to a world title 'jump off' competition in Bay St. Louis, Mississippi. Knievel had deemed Kidd to be the only jump rider in the world worthy of challenging him. The event was televised as a $19.95 pay-per-view event titled The Daredevil Duel, Knievel vs. Kidd. The competition required each rider to make three motorbike jumps, with the cumulative distance covered by each rider calculated to determine the winner of the contest. Kidd took the winner's belt with a cumulative distance of 630 feet (190 m) jumped. With one jump of 223 feet (68 m), Knievel broke the American Motorcycle Association record for a single jump.
30 Limousines jump	February 24, 1998	On February 24, 1998, Knievel attempted a record-breaking jump of 231 feet (70 m) over 30 limousines. The jump took place at the Tropicana Hotel in Las Vegas. Similar to the Caesars Palace jump, Evel Knievel was also present to support the jump.
Building-to-Building jump	February 4, 1999	On February 4, 1999, Knievel jumped the 130-foot (40 m) gap between the two 13-story Jockey Club towers in Las Vegas. To avoid falling off the second tower, Knievel intentionally crashed his motorcycle into bales of hay.
Grand Canyon jump	May 20, 1999	The Grand Canyon jump on May 20, 1999, was one of Knievel's most famous jumps. On May 20, 1999, Robbie jumped his motorcycle for a personal record of 228 feet (69 m). Knievel broke his leg in the ensuing crash. He was originally scheduled to make this jump on April 29, but bad weather forced him to postpone it for three weeks.
Train jump	February 23, 2000	On February 23, 2000, Knievel jumped over a moving locomotive at the Palestine Park Depot in Texas. Knievel approached an oncoming Texas State Railroad locomotive No. 400 traveling at 30 mph. Knievel reached the ramp at a speed of 80 mph. Knievel successfully made the jump with a safe landing.
USS Intrepid jump	July 30, 2004	On July 30, 2004, Knievel jumped over five military airplanes on the deck of the USS Intrepid in New York City. The jump was to promote the TNT TV movie Evel Knievel.
Mirage Hotel jump	December 31, 2008	On New Year's Eve of 2008, Knievel was scheduled to jump the volcano at the Mirage Hotel. At the actual 200-foot (60 m) jump, Knievel gave the appearance of jumping the volcano but limited the stunt to a ramp-to-ramp jump in front of the volcano with fireworks behind him.

=== Performance jumps ===
In 1996, Knievel jumped over ten limousines on the Las Vegas Strip, achieving a 230-foot motorbike leap record.

In 2003, Knievel jumped 15 trucks at the Chinook Winds Casino. In late March 2006, Knievel jumped 180 feet over the St. Johns River from one barge to another in Jacksonville, Florida. In late July 2006, he made a tribute jump to his father Evel at Evel Knievel Day in Butte, Montana, by jumping over a pyrotechnic show.

On March 18, 2007, Knievel jumped an assortment of military vehicles at the North Carolina Auto Expo in Raleigh, North Carolina. Soon afterward, he appeared in a nationally-broadcast commercial for Holiday Inn Express. On June 9, 2007, he appeared in Wilmington, Delaware, and successfully made a 150-foot jump over fake money representing the amount of interest paid to the customers of ING Direct. In August 2007, he was inducted into the Motorcycle Hall of Fame in Sturgis, South Dakota, and made a jump at the Buffalo Chip campground.

Knievel successfully jumped over 24 truck cabs at the Kings Island Amusement Park outside Cincinnati, Ohio, on May 24, 2008. The jump took place 33 years after his father made daredevil history by jumping over 14 Greyhound buses on a Harley-Davidson XR-750 at Kings Island.

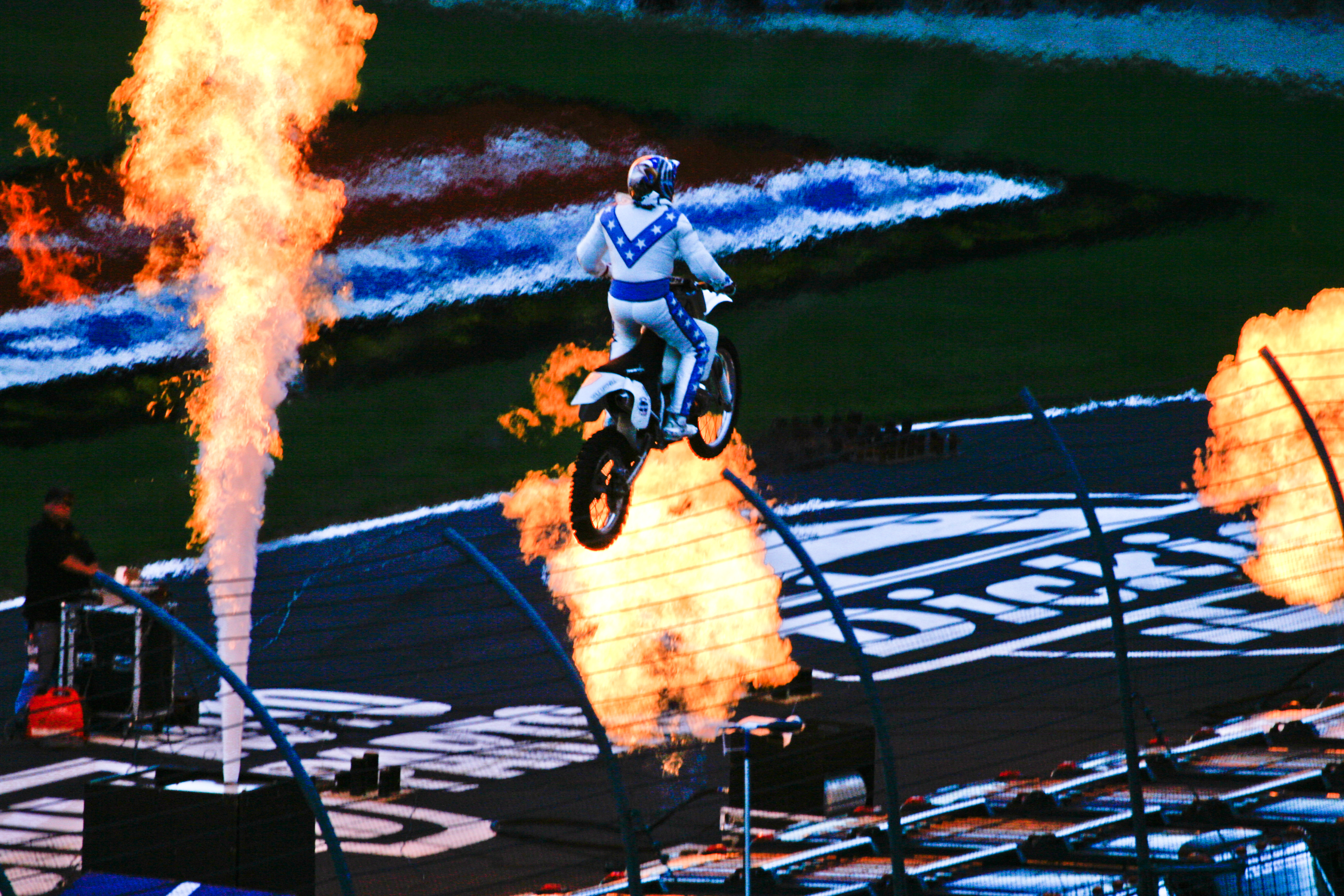
Knievel jumping 21 Hummers at Texas Motor Speedway

Knievel successfully jumped on June 7, 2008, at the Texas Motor Speedway in Fort Worth, Texas. He cleared 21 Hummers on the front stretch of the speedway. He originally was going to jump 25 Hummers, but there was a strong sustained headwind that evening.

While performing pre-jump wheelies at the LCO Casino near Hayward, Wisconsin, on August 16, 2008, Knievel fell off the bike and slid into some hay bales, dislocating his shoulder. Despite his injury, he performed the jump, clearing four small airplanes and a small helicopter.

On October 31, 2008, Knievel successfully performed two back-to-back jumps in Nashville, Tennessee, to promote a glow-in-the-dark paint. Knievel ended 2008 with a New Year's Eve jump at the newly-renovated volcano at The Mirage in Las Vegas. The stunt was advertised as a jump over the top of the Mirage's volcano; however, Knievel limited the stunt to an approximately 200-foot (60-meter) ramp-to-ramp jump in front of the volcano. He said the false promotion of a jump over the volcano was decided by the Mirage Hotel, which did not want to tear down some palm trees or have its valet parking affected. The live Fox television special marked the eighth live special in Knievel's career.

Knievel successfully jumped two 93 foot semi-trucks in Austin, TX on 6/12/2009. This was done in celebration of the 15th annual Texas Biker Rally that weekend.

Knievel's last jump was held on October 29, 2011, in Coachella, California, at the Spotlight 29 Casino. Knievel jumped 150 feet (46 m) over semi-trailer trucks.

== Television ==
In mid-2005, Knievel starred in the A&E TV series Knievel's Wild Ride. Knievel also made appearances on CHiPs and Hawaii Five-O and co-starred with Lee Majors in a pilot for a series to be called Hollywood Stunts. He was the subject of a 2017 documentary, Chasing Evel: The Robbie Knievel Story.

== Business ventures ==
In 2006, Knievel opened a new business called Knievel's Custom Cycles based in Lake Hopatcong, New Jersey.

== Personal life and death ==
Knievel had three daughters, Krysten, Karmen and Maria. He also had two grandchildren, Analise and Kane. He died on January 13, 2023 from pancreatic cancer in Reno, Nevada, at age 60.
