= Richard Hammond Meets Evel Knievel =

- Genre: Documentary
- Directed by: Nigel Simpkiss
- Presented by: Richard Hammond
- Starring: Evel Knievel
- Country of origin: United Kingdom

Production
- Executive producers: Ben Gale; Tony Moss
- Producer: Ben Devlin
- Running time: 59 minutes
- Production company: Visual Voodoo

Original release
- Network: BBC Two
- Release: 23 December 2007

Richard Hammond Meets Evel Knievel is a one-off television documentary presented by Richard Hammond and first broadcast on 23 December 2007 on BBC Two.

== Subject ==
The documentary is based around the Evel Knievel Days event in Butte, Montana and was filmed four months before Evel's death. The presenter, Richard Hammond, spends four days with former motorcycle daredevil Evel Knievel. Knievel, at age 69 years old, had become very ill requiring an oxygen tank strapped up to him constantly to aid with breathing. 48 hours before the film crew arrived, Knievel had a stroke. At several points during filming, Knievel cuts the interview short and leaves before Hammond finished asking questions.

During the festival, Knievel was meant to lead a bike parade, and invited Hammond to ride alongside him, but he was taken to hospital and was unable to lead the parade. He later showed up at the end of the day. On the last day of the festival fellow daredevil Trigger Gumms completed a jump, a jump twice as long as Knievel's former record. The day after, in the local newspaper, Knievel stated he was not impressed with the jump.

Hammond also conducts interviews with Knievel's former bodyguard Gene Sullivan, former daredevil Debbie Lawler and his former publicist Shelly Saltman, who was assaulted by Knievel in 1977, an attack which destroyed Evel's reputation, his career, and eventually landed him in jail, forcing him into bankruptcy. Strangely, on the final day of filming, Evel asked Hammond to go and view his tombstone.

Archive clips shown during the programme and discussed with Knievel include his jumps at Caesars Palace, Las Vegas, Snake River Canyon, Idaho and Wembley Stadium, London as well as his conversion in the Crystal Cathedral in California. Evel died four months after the show was filmed, one week before the programme was first broadcast.

Knievel is sympathetically but, at the same time, revealingly portrayed as a bitter old man that surely lives up to his legend, showing up for disturbing screenings and even more challenging interviews about his former traumatic failures, despite being ill and in excruciating pain, but displaying nothing more than a grudging attitude. He is reluctant to face the moral challenges that come with re-living his relationships with his family, his "rock star" behaviour patterns and, ultimately, the issue of surviving his career by a lengthy period of time. Knievel's inner controversies are captured in his reluctance to be interviewed by Hammond in the first place, and punctuated by editing and writing of the documentary. Hammond feels somewhat embarrassed to pursue his goal of clarifying the feelings of Evel about his career during the interviews, given the struggle between admiration and ire of being constantly put off by Knievel, and thus gives the viewer even more insight into the Evel's personality and the phenomenon behind his popularity. Finally, the film clearly shows Knievel shutting himself off the BBC filming team, as he finally thanks Hammond in a polite way, but firmly advises him to "get on his airplane and get outta here".

== Production ==
Filming took place on location in Butte, Montana from 25 to 29 July 2007. It can be seen during the programme that Sony DVW-790WSP Digital Betacam cameras were used to provide a widescreen (16:9 aspect ratio) 576i standard definition picture.

The documentary progresses through the five filming days in sequence. Pre-arranged interviews with Knievel and other related persons are combined with archive footage, some of which is also shown to the interviewee. Around this, some coverage of the Evel Knievel Days festival is provided, and the sections are linked together by piece to camera segments by Hammond or shots of Hammond riding around Butte on a rented Harley-Davidson motorcycle with voice-over. Hammond conveyed his thoughts before and after a day's filming in a video-diary style filmed in his hotel room at the Lincoln Hotel.

In an interview with Radio Times, Hammond described himself as being "fascinated, terrified and elated" to be in the company of Evel Knievel. Hammond said that during the filming, Knievel "shouted at me, the crew and the people with him constantly"

== Reception ==
James Walton—writing for The Daily Telegraph—said he was surprised to find Richard Hammond Meets Evel Knievel "a pretty rich documentary" describing its real strength as "[serving] up lashings of the kind of pure Americana that many other British documentaries have striven much harder for, without matching." The Scotsman presented a more mixed view saying it was a "much more reflective Top Gear-related product than usual" but commented that "Knievel was clearly getting fed up of Hammond and, frankly, I was getting tired of him". In contrast to Hammond's conclusion that Knievel was still his hero, the journalist wrote "For those of us who didn't play with the wind-up motorbike doll when we were six, [Knievel] didn't seem all that heroic".

The Observer's Roger Alton describes the show as one of the highlights of the Christmas period when it was first shown, calling it a "fantastic achievement" and describing it as a "stunning, poignant, visually saturated interview". Paul Hirons on the TV Scoop website described it as an "entertaining and poignant documentary" and admired Hammond's "refreshingly non-arse-kissy approach to interviewing his hero" but described it as "a shame" that Knievel had not warmed to Hammond.

David Belcher's article in The Herald was far more critical describing it as "hellish to witness grievous damage being done to the Hamster's cuddly reputation by the ill-advised documentary farrago that was Richard Hammond Meets Evel Knievel." He described Hammond's "worship" of Knievel as "oddly punitive" as he "pursued the dying man through the streets of his shabby home town, Butte, Montana."

=== Ratings ===
The programme finished second in its 9 p.m. timeslot on its first showing in the UK, obtaining 4.4 million viewers which corresponded to an 18% audience share. It beat ITV1's terrestrial premiere of the film Vanity Fair which obtained an audience 2.6 million but was beaten by Monarchy: the Royal Family at Work on sister channel BBC One which drew 5.3 million viewers. The programme was preceded on BBC Two by the last episode of Top Gear's 2007 series (and the evening was promoted as "Top Gear Night") which had obtained 6.8 million viewers, 2.4 million more than the number that watched Richard Hammond Meets Evel Knievel.
