= Evel Knievel Museum =

- Location within Kansas
- Established: 2017
- Location: Topeka, Kansas, United States
- Coordinates: 39.030177°N 95.683578°W
- Type: History museum
- Collections: Evel Knievel
- Founders: Lathan McKay, Mike Patterson, James Caplinger
- Public transit access: Line 21 (Topeka Metro)
- Parking: On site (no charge)
- Website: Https://Ekexperience.com

The Evel Knievel Museum is a non-profit museum formerly located in Topeka, Kansas, United States. The museum houses the largest collection of authentic Evel Knievel memorabilia in the world, including interactive experiences. In May 2024, it was officially announced the museum will close its Topeka location and move to Las Vegas, Nevada. Construction is ongoing on the new building with expected opening in early 2026.

== History ==
It was established and founded by Mike Patterson, Lathan McKay and James Caplinger.

Evel Knievel during his lifetime expressed the goal of having a museum honoring his legacy. Evel Archaeology began in February 2012 to re-collect Knievel's motorcycles, vehicles, wardrobe, artifacts, and personal effects.

In 2013 a mutual connection to rock and roll legend Jerry Lee Lewis and a Mack truck laid the foundation for the Evel Knievel Museum. Frustrated with a lack of progress, Lathan McKay and Marilyn Stemp set out to find a new home for Knievel's Mack truck dubbed "Big Red" as the restoration had stalled. A business partner made a phone call to Harley-Davidson dealer Mike Patterson of Topeka, Kansas, whose team of motorcycle restoration experts had recently completed a ground-up rebuilding of Jerry Lee Lewis's 1959 Panhead.

Patterson's team had never restored a Mack truck, but they had access to the expertise needed and nearly 100 individuals signed on to the project. During the 18-month restoration, Patterson, Mckay, and James Caplinger decided to build the Evel Knievel Museum. Patterson built an addition to his Harley-Davidson dealership in Topeka to house the attraction.

The Evel Knievel museum was named one of the top 10 best new national attractions in 2017 by USA Today, and is officially authorized by the Knievel estate.

== Founders and Personnel ==
Mike Patterson is a former professional flat track racer and businessman. His grandfather Henry purchased Topeka Harley-Davidson in March 1949. In 1975 his son Dennis joined him and carried on until the late 1980s when his nephew Mike entered the business.

Lathan McKay is an American historian, producer, entrepreneur, actor, former skateboarder, and filmmaker. He amassed the largest collection of Evel Knievel memorabilia in the world.

James M. Caplinger was a real estate developer, attorney, philanthropist, and business owner from Topeka, Kansas.

The museum director is Bruce Zimmerman

== Details ==
The 13,000-square-foot two story museum and Historic Harley Davidson dealership was located adjacent to the Kansas Expocenter at the corner of SW Topeka Boulevard and SW 21st Street.

== Knievel ==
Robert Craig Knievel (/kˈniːvəl/; October 17, 1938 – November 30, 2007), professionally known as Evel Knievel, was an American stunt performer and entertainer. Throughout his career, he attempted more than 75 ramp-to-ramp motorcycle jumps. He was particularly popular among kids, helped by the production of Evel Knievel toys.

== Exhibits ==
The Evel Knievel Museum chronicles Knievel's life from his early years in Butte, Montana to the height of his fame in the 1970s. The time-lined exhibits are arranged in chronological order, with more than 1,000 artifacts on display, consisting of personal memorabilia, motorcycles, ephemera, and interactive exhibits. One example is the "4D Virtual Reality Jump" exhibit featuring Doug Danger, which allows visitors to experience Knievel's stunt thrills first-hand but without the risks.

The museum is known for being the home to Knievel's 1974 Mack Truck & Trailer "Big Red", the star-spangled helmets and leathers, and numerous other artifacts, including:

- Knievel's original jump bikes, performance leathers, helmets, and wardrobe
- Knievel's world-famous Mack truck, “Big Red”
- Snake River Canyon Skycycle-X2
- Caesars Palace crash helmet
- Wembley Stadium crash helmet
- Viva Knievel screen used memorabilia
- Knievel's famed flask-filled walking cane and jewelry
- Custom red Cadillac pickup truck
- Ideal Toy Company and licensing exhibit
- Personal effects such as family photographs, contracts, and letters
- 1977 J. C. Agajanian special Evel Knievel Indianapolis race car
- Knievel's first 1970 Harley-Davidson XR-750 iron head jump bike
- Interactive 4D virtual reality jump experience
- Interactive broken bones x-ray exhibit
- Interactive jump planner
- Evel Knievel movie theater
- Knievel's crash car
- Knievel's Harley Davidson Sportster trike

== Recognition ==
Upon completion the Evel Knievel Museum was named one of the Top 10 Best New Attractions in 2017 by USA Today. In April 2019 the museum received a Thea award from the Themed Entertainment Association for being one of the best new attractions in the United States.
