= Being Evel =

- Film poster
- Directed by: Daniel Junge
- Written by: Davis Coombe; Daniel Junge
- Produced by: Daniel Junge; Jeff Tremaine; Johnny Knoxville; Mat Hoffman; Brendan Kiernan; Justin Moore-Lewy
- Starring: Evel Knievel; George Hamilton; Johnny Knoxville; Mat Hoffman; Travis Pastrana; Tony Hawk; Seth Enslow; Lathan McKay; Sheldon Saltman; Ken Berg; Mark Lisac; Ray Gunn; Kelly Knievel; Linda Knievel
- Cinematography: Robert Muratore
- Edited by: Davis Coombe
- Music by: John Jennings Boyd
- Production companies: Dickhouse Productions; HeLo
- Distributed by: Gravitas Ventures
- Release date: January 25, 2015 (Sundance Film Festival)
- Running time: 99 minutes
- Country: United States
- Language: English

Being Evel is a 2015 American documentary film about daredevil Evel Knievel, directed by Daniel Junge. The film documents his real life story until his death in 2007. It debuted at the 2015 Sundance Film Festival in January. It was produced by Jackass star Johnny Knoxville, who is one of the film's main interviewees.

== Release ==
The film premiered at the 2015 Sundance Film Festival. It was also screened at the Sydney Film Festival in June 2015, and London Film Festival in October 2015.

== Critical reception ==
The review aggregator website Rotten Tomatoes calculated a 97% approval rating based on 36 reviews. The site's critical consensus reads: "Insightful and swiftly paced, Being Evel is an entertaining, well-crafted overview of an unforgettable character."
