= Ben Devlin (producer) =

British television executive producer

Ben Devlin is a British television executive producer and true crime audiobook publisher. After periods working in journalism including a stint at British newspaper The Daily Telegraph, he entered television broadcasting and worked for the BBC, Rapido TV, Clive James's Watchmaker Films, Graham Norton's So TV and Visual Voodoo, the entertainment arm of ITN. His television credits range from The Generation Game to Welcome to Earth with Will Smith.

He now specialises in creating true crime audiobooks.

== Audiobook credits ==
- Trials of the Century

== Past TV producer credits ==
- 100 Greatest Stand-Ups - Channel 4
- Richard Hammond Meets Evel Knievel - BBC Two
- The Million Dollar Mind Reader: Derek Ogilvie - Channel 5
- James Hewitt Under Hypnosis - Channel 5
- The Jules and Lulu Show - ITV
