= Debbie Lawler =

American motorcycle daredevil

- Born: December 13, 1952 (age 73); Grants Pass, Oregon
- Occupation: stunt performer
- Known for: Motorcycle daredevil

Debbie Lawler (born December 13, 1952) is an American motorcyclist and stunt performer. Lawler is most noted as the first and the only female motorcyclist to beat one of Evel Knievel's jump records.

== Life and Career ==
Lawler grew up with two sisters in Medford, Oregon. When she was in her teens, the family moved to Arizona. Her father, Ben Lawler, was a motorcycle racing veteran. She learned to ride at the age of nine, and for her tenth birthday, her father gave her a motorcycle. She began racing at the age of 14 as well as her two sisters, who were also racing. As a teenager, she was a cheerleader at her high school and later was booked for modeling assignments.

During this time, Lawler started motorcycle jumping, which she practiced in the Arizona desert. When she was 19, a family acquaintance invited her to participate in a local thrill show, where she was discovered by Charles Samples, who represented her as her manager from that point on. Charles Samples had previously represented the Astro Jumpers, the motorcycle jump duo Gary Davis and Rex Blackwell. He was the one who staged and encouraged her girlish image in contrast to the male-connoted motorcycle stunt shows.

Lawler began jumping at fairs and speedways in 1972. On March 31, 1973, she jumped 76 feet (about 23 meters) over a row of parked cars at Beeline Dragway in Phoenix.

On February 3, 1974, Lawler beat Evel Knievel's indoor jump record at the Houston Astrodome with a jump of 101 feet over 16 Chevrolet pickup trucks. She was the first woman to set this kind of record. Debbie Lawler was only 21 years old at the time. The jump was broadcast live on ABC's Wide World of Sports and secured her an entry in the 1975 Guinness Book of World Records. Unlike Knievel, who bragged about not practicing his jumps, Lawler had a very precise driving and jumping technique due to intensive training accurately landing on the pink heart that marked her landing point. Her record was beaten the same month by Evel Knievel in Portland in a jump over 17 cars, but Lawler remained the female world record holder for this jumping distance.

Just one month later, Lawler crashed at the Ontario Motor Speedway while attempting to clear a jumping distance of 104 feet over 15 Datsun automobiles on a motorcycle. The jump was successful, but due to increased wind speeds caused by the unpredictable Santa Ana winds, the vehicle slipped away after landing at 145 feet and she was thrown into a concrete barrier wall after rolling off. She broke three vertebrae. After a six-month convalescence period, she started performing again, but retired for good after only three jumps.

The motorcycle Lawler used for her jumps was a Suzuki TM 250.

In June 1976, Lawler provided the television commentary for CBS Sports Spectacular on Super Joe Einhorn's daredevil show as he beat another of Evel Knievel's records by jumping 15 buses at the Lancaster Speedway in Buffalo.

Lawler later set up a talent agency and produced motorcycle stunt shows.

== Trivia ==
Lawler was called America's stunt sweetheart, flying angel, and the female Evel Knievel. Two weeks after her crash in 1974, Evel Knievel presented her with a pink mink coat on the Mike Douglas Show, to which she appeared in a wheelchair. By this time, Knievel had already reclaimed his record. In an BBC documentary titled Richard Hammond Meets Evel Knievel, she said that the coat had an embroidered message on the inside: “Happy Landings. Love, Evel.”

In 1974, the same year as her record, toy manufacturer Kenner Products marketed a Debbie Lawler Daredevil Jump Set for girls. It is now considered a collector's item.

Lawler wore a light blue jumpsuit with applications of pink leather hearts during her shows. Also the landing point of her jump ramp was a pink heart. By her own admission, she never jumped without her orange bra.

It is believed that the character Tracey Butler (“The Lavender Lady”), the fictional adversary of Evil Knievel in the unpublished pilot episode of the never-realized 1974 television series Evel Knievel, was based on Debbie Lawler.

== Post-fame ==
The High Desert Museum in Bend, Oregon dedicated an exhibition to the daredevils Debbie Lawler, Kitty O'Neil, Denny Edwards and Evel Knievel from 2020 to 2021. Among other things, it displayed the pink mink coat that Lawler had received from Knievel.
