= Lathan McKay =

American historian, producer, actor, and entrepreneur

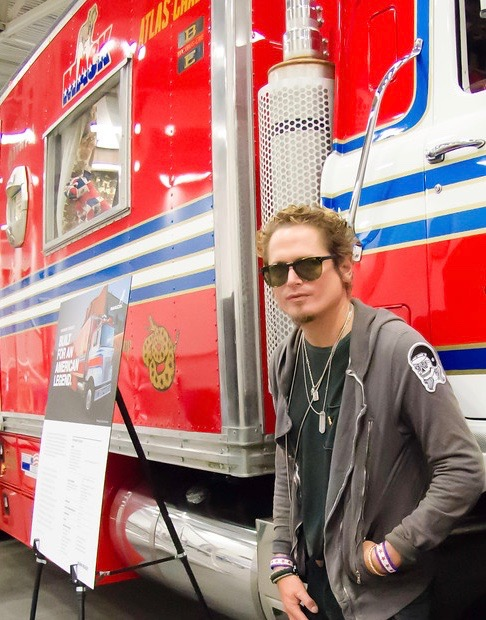
- Born: Lathan McKay
- Occupations: Producer; historian; actor; writer; entrepreneur
- Years active: 2002–present
- Notable credits: I Am Evel Knievel; Chasing Evel; Being Evel; Levelland; Road to Nowhere
- Television: Evel Live 2 (A&E), Collision Course (Reelz)

Lathan McKay is an American film and television producer, historian, actor, writer and co-founder of the Evel Knievel Museum. As a former professional skateboarder, he has amassed the largest collection of Evel Knievel memorabilia in the world. The collection now resides at the official Evel Knievel Museum Las Vegas .

== Biography ==
He started skateboarding as a child and became sponsored at 14. Inspired by Evel Knievel, he spent a decade on the road as a professional, breaking for a year to attend college in Austin. McKay became a '70s-era cinephile and was inspired by existential films like Cisco Pike, Night Moves, Charley Varrick, Little Fauss and Big Halsy, Thunderbolt and Lightfoot, films by Sam Peckinpah, and particularly Monte Hellman’s Two-Lane Blacktop.

2003–11

In 2003, McKay starred in Levelland, a film about coming of age in the flatlands of Texas. Several of its non-fictional characters were skateboarders, and director Clark Lee Walker, co-writer of The Newton Boys, cast avid skateboarders to act in the film. Levelland premiered at the 2003 Tribeca Film Festival.

In 2004, McKay moved to Los Angeles to continue a career as an actor. As he was looking for a place to live, he was introduced to his favorite film director Monte Hellman by a friend, actor Nicky Katt. Hellman had a spare room in his Laurel Canyon home, and McKay moved in. He performed in several films, and in 2008, he was cast to portray Layne Staley of Alice In Chains in Layne Staley: Get Born Again. This biographical film went into production but was never completed due to estate and legal issues.

McKay continued to act, but became more interested in all aspects of filmmaking. In 2008 he joined Melissa and Monte Hellman’s newly formed production company, wearing many hats as his late mentor Hellman's assistant on the 2010 Golden Lion award-winning film Road to Nowhere. He also performed and produced alongside the Hellman family.

McKay played a significant role in the re-release of Two-Lane Blacktop, assisting production on Somewhere Near Salinas with Kris Kristofferson and appearing in On the Road Again; Two-Lane Blacktop Revisited, through The Criterion Collection.

== Evel Archaeology ==
2012–18

Long enamored with his own father's and Evel Knievel's “live your dreams“ philosophy, McKay began his collection of Evel Knievel memorabilia in early 2012. After months of research and lengthy negotiation, he acquired his first set of Knievel's 1974 jump leathers and a performance helmet. Soon after, he traveled to Knievel's hometown of Butte, Montana for the annual Evel Knievel Days celebration. Forming connections with Knievel family, crew and fans. During a 2014 interview, McKay noted that none of Knievel's memorabilia was at the celebrations and that Knievel's ramps were left to rot in fields. This helped motivate him and his team.

With partnerships from the Knievel family, McKay, Robby Hull and Marilyn Stemp set out to resurrect Evel Knievel Enterprises. Thus began a worldwide hunt for Knievel memorabilia, which McKay termed "Evel Archaeology." By 2015, he owned the largest Evel Knievel collection ever assembled. He has exhibited the collection throughout the United States consistently since it was first displayed in 2013. It includes six jump bikes; X-rays of Evel's broken bones Knievel's performance leathers; and most iconic helmets, wardrobe, and personal effects.

After it was featured on the television series American Trucker, McKay purchased the truck Big Red with the assistance of Robb Mariani. The Mack truck Knievel used as living quarters and bike and ramp hauler and was badly weather-damaged. McKay, Mike Patterson, and his team of restoration experts at Historic Harley-Davidson in Topeka, Kansas, refurbished Big Red. A bolt-by-bolt restoration which took 22 months, 96 people and over $300,000.00 The truck's interior and exterior were restored to its exact condition in the 70s when Knievel, at the height of his popularity, travelled in it.

It debuted and led the yearly parade at Evel Knievel Days in Butte in 2015. Driven by Mike Draper, who began driving for Knievel in the early 1970s, Big Red was displayed on tour at events throughout the United States with the support of Mack Trucks. The tour schedule included Evel Knievel days, Sturgis, Hollywood, Texas Motor Speedway and the Great American Trucking Show. It was the star attraction at the premiere of the documentary Being Evel. Big Red is to be permanently housed at the Evel Knievel Museum, which opened in Topeka, Kansas in July 2017. McKay refers to it as the "mothership" of his collection.

McKay was also a co-producer and rare film and photo archivist for the Emmy nominated documentary Being Evel with producers Johnny Knoxville and George Hamilton. He appeared in Derik Murray's documentary I Am Evel Knievel, with Matthew McConaughey, for which he was also a co-producer/archivist, and executive produced the Leo Award-winning feature-length documentary Chasing Evel: The Life of Robbie Knievel, which premiered at the Big Sky Documentary Film Festival and Nashville Film Festival in 2017. It was released worldwide in 2018.

2019–2020

In 2019 editing began on Resurrecting Evel/Evelution. Both films documenting the undertaking that was the restoration of Evel Knievel's Mack truck and the six-year journey that lead to the opening of the Museum. McKay co-produced and was featured in both the Austin, Texas-based film Off The Record and Reelz channel's Collision Course. In April 2019 production began on Evel Live 2 for A&E Networks and the Evel Knievel Museum received a THEA Award awarded by Themed Entertainment Association for being one of the best new attractions in the United States. Production for NBCUniversal's limited series Evel starring Milo Ventimiglia began in early January, 2020. The limited series was shut down just three days prior to principal photography due to the COVID-19 pandemic.

2021–2027

In October 2021 Network Entertainment began production on The Evel Way. A biographical series documenting the ten-year journey of Mckay’s Evel Archaeology project intertwined with the reconnecting of Evel’s original crew and the arduous journey to the Snake River Canyon Jump.

In August 2022 It was leaked that the Evel Knievel Museum was relocating to Las Vegas, Nevada.

In May 2022 History Channel began production on The Icons Who Built America which Mckay appeared, co-produced and provided the original Evel Knievel archival materials.

On June 28, 2023, Variety magazine announced that Mckay’s Sam Peckinpah archive and collection found its permanent home at the National Cowboy & Western Heritage Museum in Oklahoma City, Oklahoma.

May 14th 2024, The official announcement of the Evel Knievel Museum’s relocation to Las Vegas was announced. In July 2026 the Evel Knievel Experience opened its doors in Las Vegas, Nevada.

== Personal life ==
The years 2015 to 2017 were fortuitous as the inaugural tour of Big Red (partnering with Mack Trucks) went nationwide. It led the parade at Evel Knievel Days in Butte, Montana. McKay and Doug Danger successfully completed their mutual dream of the world record 22-car jump on Evel's Harley Davidson XR750. During the 75th anniversary of the Sturgis Motorcycle Rally at the legendary Buffalo Chip Campground. In 2015 he again partnered with the Knievel family on Evel Ale, a custom beer made by South Austin Brewery.

The Evel Knievel Museum opened in June 2017.

In July 2021 The Divine Horsemen released a reunion recording of new material that included a song titled "Falling Forward". McKay co-wrote the song with founding member Julie Christensen.

In October 2021 pre-production began on a feature-length narrative docudrama on Mckay’s life with Derik Murray’s Network Entertainment. Principal photography began in Kansas, California, Idaho, Montana and continues throughout 2024-2026. In January 2026 McKay and partner Elizabeth Mack launched American Icon Spirits under the Evel Knievel brand.

== Filmography ==
Year	Title	Credit	Medium
1995	411 Video Magazine - Houston Metrospective	Skateboarder (himself)	Video magazine
1997	Ten Losers	Skateboarder (himself)	Video
1997	Austin Stories	Skateboarder, Episode 7	MTV series
1999	ATX	Skateboarder (himself)	Video
2000	Reflection Understood	Skateboarder (himself)	Video
2000	Miss Congeniality	Actor (himself)	Feature Film
2001	Logic #2 Scope-Austin Texas	Skateboarder (himself)	Video magazine
2001	The Right Girl	Actor (skateboarder)	Film
2002	Pastime	Editor, skateboarder (himself)	Video feature
2002	The New Guy	Stunts (skateboarder)	Feature film
2003	Levelland	Actor (Nick Stanley)	Feature film
2005	Protest Kids	Actor (Varan)	Short film
2007	Two-Lane Blacktop (Revisited)	Production, actor (himself)	Short film
2007	Somewhere Near Salinas, Kris Kristofferson	Production	Short film
2008	Harold	Actor (Officer Shannon)	Feature film
2009	Layne Staley and Demri	Actor (Layne Staley)	Short film
2011	Road to Nowhere	Associate producer, actor (Erik), director’s assistant	Feature film
2011	Trichotomy	Writer, actor (The Kid)	Video short
2011	Echo Park Love Story	Actor (The Artist)	Short film
2012	Snake River Canyon	Archival	Short film
2012	True Evel	Archival, film, photo	TV documentary
2013	Pure Evel	Archival, film, photo	TV documentary
2014	I Am Evel Knievel	Himself, Archival, Consulting Producer	TV documentary
2014	Sal and the Goon	Co-executive producer	Short film
2014	Evel Knievel Lives On	Archival, (himself)	Documentary short
2015	Being Evel	Co-producer, archival (himself)	Feature documentary
2015	Road to the Record; Doug Danger	Associate producer	TV movie
2016	Color Me Lucky	Executive producer, actor (Evel)	Video short
2016	Tim Montana - Shredneck USA	Himself, Episode 3	Web series
2016	BBC Four Storyville	Co-producer, archival, 1 episode	TV series
2017	Resurrecting Evel Knievel	Director, executive producer, editor (himself)	Documentary short
2017	Mysteries at the Museum	Archival, contributor (himself), 1 episode	TV series
2017	Chasing Evel; The Life of Robbie Knievel	Executive producer, contributor (himself), archival	Documentary
2018	Collision Course Evel Knievel Reelz	Co-producer, Archival, (himself)	Reelz TV series
2018	Off the Record	Producer, actor (Simms)	Feature film
2018	Evel Live	Archival	History TV series
2019	Evelution; Evel Knievel	Director, executive producer, editor, writer (himself)	Documentary
2019	Evel Live 2	Panelist (himself), archival	History TV series
2020	Evel Live Redemption	Panelist (himself), archival	History TV series
2020	Evel	Associate producer, consulting producer	Universal TV series
2020	The Evel Knievel Way 1 & 2	Director, Writer	Short Film
2021	Stuntman	Archival Filmhttps://en.wikipedia.org/wiki/Evel_Knievel_Museum	Feature Film
2022	Evel Ways	Executive producer, (himself)	Feature film
2023	The Icons That Built America	Associate Producer, Archival (himself)	History TV Series
2024	Talking Evel	Associate producer, (himself)	Docu-Series
2025	American Pickers	Consulting producer, archival	History TV Series
2026	American Pickers	(himself)	History TV Series
2027	Finding Evel	(himself)	Biopic Feature
