= List of Evel Knievel career jumps =

The career jumps and stunts of motorcycle daredevil Evel Knievel spanned from 1965 to 1980. As a professional daredevil, Knievel attempted or successfully jumped over 75 ramp-to-ramp motorcycle jumps, as well as his failed 1974 X-2 Skycycle rocket jump. The majority of his jumps were made on the Harley-Davidson XR-750 motorcycle.

Date	Location	Obstacle	Distance	Motorcycle	Outcome	Injuries
1965	Moses Lake, Washington	Rattlesnakes and two Mountain Lions	40 feet (12 m)	Honda 305cc Scrambler	Successful	Sprained ankle
January 23, 1966	Indio, California	Two pick-up trucks	45 feet (14 m)	Norton N15	Successful	None
February 10, 1966	Barstow, California	A speeding motorcycle	Mid-air jump	No motorcycle	Missed jump	Groin injured
June 1, 1966	Kellogg, Idaho	12 Cars	62 feet (19 m)	Norton 750cc Atlas	Successful (First jump over cars)	
June 19, 1966	Missoula, Montana	13 cars	Unknown	Norton N15	Landed short	Knocked unconscious/broken arm/broken ribs
October 30, 1966	Butte, Montana	14 cars	Unknown	Norton N15	Successful	None
November 19, 1966	Tucson, Arizona	10 Dodge cars	Unknown	Norton N15	Successful	None
March 25, 1967	Ascot Park; Gardena, California	15 cars	Unknown	Triumph Bonneville T120	Successful	None (video of first televised jump)
June 1967	Ascot Park; Gardena, California	16 cars	Unknown	Triumph Bonneville T120	Successful	None
July 28, 1967	Tacoma, Washington	16 cars	Unknown	Triumph Bonneville T120	Fell off landing	Light concussion
August 18, 1967	Tacoma, Washington	16 cars	Unknown	Triumph Bonneville T120	Successful	None
September 24, 1967	Monroe, Washington	16 Chevrolets	Unknown	Triumph Bonneville T120	Successful	None
November 24, 1967	San Francisco, California	Three Motorcycles	100 feet (30 m)	Triumph Bonneville T120	Successful	None
November 25, 1967	San Francisco, California	Triumph Banner	Unknown	Triumph Bonneville T120	Successful	None
November 26, 1967	San Francisco, California	Volkswagen bus and a van	Unknown	Triumph Bonneville T120	Successful	None
December 2, 1967	Long Beach Arena; Long Beach, California	10 cars	Unknown	Triumph Bonneville T120	Successful	None
December 31, 1967	Caesars Palace; Las Vegas, Nevada	Caesars Palace fountains	141 feet (43 m) (longest of career)	Triumph Bonneville T120	Crashed on landing	29-day hospital stay/broken ribs/broken hip/crushed pelvis (footage of crash)
May 25, 1968	Scottsdale, Arizona	13 cars	Unknown	Triumph Bonneville T120	Crashed on landing	Broken leg/fractured foot
August 3, 1968	Meridian, Idaho	13 cars	Unknown	Triumph Bonneville T120	Successful	None
August 26, 1968	Spokane, Washington	13 cars	Unknown	Triumph Bonneville T120	Successful	None
September 7, 1968	Missoula, Montana	13 cars	Unknown	Honda CL-350 Scrambler	Successful	None
September 1968	Salt Lake City, Utah	Unknown	Unknown	Honda CL-350 Scrambler	Successful	None
October 13, 1968	Tahoe-Carson Speedway; Carson City, Nevada	10 cars	Unknown	Honda CL-350 Scrambler	Struck top of box truck short of landing ramp	Broken shoulder/broken hip
April 1969	Los Angeles, California	8 cars	80 feet (24 m)	American Eagle 750cc	Successful	None
July 6, 1969	Gardena, California	17 cars	Unknown	American Eagle 750cc	Successful	None
January 23, 1970	San Francisco, California	11 cars	Unknown	American Eagle 750cc	Successful	None
April 5, 1970	Seattle International Raceway; Kent Washington	13 cars	Unknown	American Eagle 750cc	Successful	None
April 5, 1970	Seattle International Raceway; Kent Washington	18 cars	120 feet (37 m)	American Eagle 750cc	Successful	None
May 10, 1970	Yakima Speedway; Yakima, Washington	13 Pepsi trucks	100 feet (30 m)	American Eagle 750cc	Landed on ramp and fell	Broken collarbone
June 19, 1970	Vancouver, Canada	12 cars	Unknown	American Eagle 750cc	Successful	None
July 4, 1970	Kent, Washington	19 cars	Unknown	American Eagle 750cc	Lost traction in wet grass on approach and landed short on edge of safety ramp. Crashed on down-ramp.	Cracked ribs/fractured vertebrae
August 16, 1970	Pocono Raceway; Long Pond, Pennsylvania	No obstacles between ramps	Unknown	American Eagle 750cc	Crashed on landing	Cracked vertebrae/broken shoulder/broken hand. First jump in the eastern United States
December 12, 1970	Lions Drag Strip; Los Angeles, California;	13 cars	Unknown	Harley-Davidson XR-750	Successful	None
January 2, 1971	Astrodome; Houston, Texas	13 cars	Unknown	Harley-Davidson XR-750	Successful	None
February 1971	Ontario Motor Speedway; Ontario, California	19 cars	129 feet (39 m)	Harley-Davidson XR-750	Successful	None
March 1971	Chicago, Illinois	Unknown	Unknown	Harley-Davidson XR-750	Successful	First jump in the Midwest US
July 1971	Madison Square Garden; New York City, New York	9 cars and 1 van	Unknown	Harley-Davidson XR-750	Successful	None
July 1971	Buffalo, New York	13 vehicles	Unknown	Harley-Davidson XR-750	Successful	None
July 1971	Wilkes-Barre, Pennsylvania	12 Stegmaier Beer trucks	Unknown	Harley-Davidson XR-750	Successful	None
August 27, 1971	The Spectrum; Philadelphia, Pennsylvania	8 cars and 1 van	Unknown	Harley-Davidson XR-750	Successful	None
September 16, 1971	Great Barrington, Massachusetts	16 cars	Unknown	Harley-Davidson XR-750	Lost control after landing	None
September 18, 1971	Great Barrington, Massachusetts	10 cars	Unknown	Harley-Davidson XR-750	Successful	None
September 25, 1971	Hutchinson, Kansas	10 Kenworth trucks	Unknown	Harley-Davidson XR-750	Successful	None
October 10, 1971	Lakeside Speedway, Kansas City, Kansas	14 Dodge Colts	Unknown	Harley-Davidson XR-750	Successful	None
October 21, 1971	Portland, Oregon	12 cars and 2 vans	Unknown	Harley-Davidson XR-750	Successful	Broken hand on landing
January 23, 1972	Tucson, Arizona	12 cars and 3 vans	Unknown	Harley-Davidson XR-750	Successful	None
February 1972	Chicago, Illinois	Unknown	Unknown	Harley-Davidson XR-750	Successful	None
March 2, 1972	Cow Palace; San Francisco, California	12 cars	Unknown	Harley-Davidson XR-750	Successful	None
March 3, 1972	Cow Palace; San Francisco, California	15 cars	Unknown	Harley-Davidson XR-750	Crashed on landing	Broken ankle/bruised ribs/bruised hand
March 1972	Detroit, Michigan	13 cars	Unknown	Harley-Davidson XR-750	Crashed into wall after landing	Broken collarbone
April 1972	Plymouth, California	100 rattlesnakes and 2 vans	Unknown	Harley-Davidson XR-750	Successful	None
June 11, 1972	Atlanta, Georgia	13 Cadillacs	Unknown	Harley-Davidson XR-750 (First jump on alloy head XR750)	Overshot practice jump	Hurt both hands/compression fracture in back. First jump in the southern US
June 17, 1972	Oklahoma City, Oklahoma	3 cars	Unknown	Harley-Davidson XR-750	Successful	None
June 18, 1972	Oklahoma City, Oklahoma	5 cars and 2 vans	Unknown	Harley-Davidson XR-750	Successful	None
June 25–26, 1972	East St. Louis	10 cars	Unknown	Harley-Davidson XR-750	Successful	None
July 30, 1972	Castle Rock, Colorado	7 trucks and 4 cars	Unknown	Harley-Davidson XR-750	Successful	None
September 1–2, 1972	Monroe, Washington	22 cars	Unknown	Harley-Davidson XR-750	Cleared 21 cars and hit safety deck	None
January 5–7, 1973	Las Vegas, Nevada	Several jumps leading up to 13 vans	Unknown	Harley-Davidson XR-750	Successful	None
February 18, 1973	Los Angeles Memorial Coliseum; Los Angeles, California	50 piled cars	Unknown	Harley-Davidson XR-750	Successful	None
February 23–25, 1973	Cleveland, Ohio	Unknown	Unknown	Harley-Davidson XR-750	Successful	None
March 2–4, 1973	Uniondale, New York	Unknown	Unknown	Harley-Davidson XR-750	Successful	None
March 16–18, 1973	Atlanta, Georgia	Unknown	Unknown	Harley-Davidson XR-750	Successful	None
March 23–25, 1973	Chicago, Illinois	Unknown	Unknown	Harley-Davidson XR-750	Successful	None
March 30, 1973	Detroit, Michigan	Unknown	Unknown	Harley-Davidson XR-750	Successful	None
April 13–15, 1973	St. Paul, Minnesota	Unknown	Unknown	Harley-Davidson XR-750	Successful	None
April 27–29, 1973	Cincinnati, Ohio	Unknown	Unknown	Harley-Davidson XR-750	Successful	None
June 22–24, 1973	Union Grove, Wisconsin	13 cars	Unknown	Harley-Davidson XR-750	Successful	None
July 29, 1973	Providence, Rhode Island	Unknown	Unknown	Harley-Davidson XR-750	Successful	None
October 6–7, 1973	Kaukauna, Wisconsin	10 cars and 3 trucks	Unknown	Harley-Davidson XR-750	Crashed during repeat show	Fractured hand/bruised back/bruised kidneys
October 20, 1973	Philadelphia, Pennsylvania	13 vehicles	Unknown	Harley-Davidson XR-750	Successful	None
February 17, 1974	Green Valley Raceway; North Richland Hills, Texas	11 Mac trucks	Unknown	Harley-Davidson XR-750	Successful, landed at bottom of ramp	Compression fracture in back
March 29, 1974	Portland Memorial Coliseum; Portland, Oregon	10 cars and 7 vans	Unknown	Harley-Davidson XR-750	Successful	None
April 13, 1974	Fremont, California	10 Mac trucks	Unknown	Harley-Davidson XR-750	Successful	None
April 20, 1974	Orange County International Raceway, Irvine, California	10 Mac trucks	Unknown	Harley-Davidson XR-750	Successful	None
April 28, 1974	Kansas City, Missouri	10 Mac trucks	Unknown	Harley-Davidson XR-750	Successful	None
May 5, 1974	Tulsa, Oklahoma	10 Mac trucks	Unknown	Harley-Davidson XR-750	Successful	None
May 25–27, 1974	West Salem, Ohio	10 Mac trucks	Unknown	Harley-Davidson XR-750	Successful	None
August 20, 1974	Toronto, Ontario	13 Mac trucks	105 feet (32 m)	Harley-Davidson XR-750	Successful	None (article)
September 8, 1974	Twin Falls, Idaho	Snake River Canyon	1730 feet (527 m)	X-2 Skycycle Steam-powered rocket	Parachute deployed at launch, slammed into rocks on the river's edge	Broken nose, minor scrapes and cuts
May 26, 1975	Wembley Stadium; London, England	13 single-decker buses	120 feet (37 m)	Harley-Davidson XR-750	Landed on 13th bus	Fractured pelvis/broken hand/concussion
October 25, 1975	Kings Island	14 Greyhound buses	133 feet (41 m)	Harley-Davidson XR-750	Successful	None (footage of jump)
October 11, 1976	Worcester, Massachusetts	3 jumps (4 vans then 7 vans, then 10 vans)	unknown	Harley-Davidson XR-750	Successful	None
October 29–30, 1976	Kingdome; Seattle, Washington	7 Greyhound buses	Unknown	Harley-Davidson XR-750	Successful	None
January 31, 1977	International Amphitheatre; Chicago, Illinois	13 sharks	90 feet (27 m)	Harley-Davidson XR-750	Crashed during practice jump	Fractured collarbone/fractured right arm/heavy bruising. Final jump
February 1979	Australia	Did not jump	N/A	Triumph Bonneville T140	N/A	N/A
March 1980	Puerto Rico	Did not jump	N/A	Triumph Bonneville T140	N/A	N/A

Canadian Jumps:

Evel did at least 15 jumps in Canada. More jumps may not have been well documented. Aside from Wembley, they were the only jumps Evel did outside of the US. The first was June 19th 1970, at the Pacific Coliseum in Vancouver. Evel successfully jumped 12 cars. July 4th,1970: 12 cars at the PNE Grounds Vancouver. June 20, 1971: Jumped 12 cars at Winnipeg Stadium. June 24th, 1971: Jumped 14 cars at the Winnipeg Arena. July 1st, 1971:10 cars, Edmonton Exhibition Grounds. July 9th, 1971, he attempted to jump 13 cars at the Calgary Stampede (Calgary Alberta), but crashed. He broke his ankle and fractured his arm. Despite this, he jumped in Montreal on July 16th 17th & 18th, at the Montreal Forum, jumping 10, 12 & then 13 cars. He jumped 15 cars at the Pacific Coliseum in Vancouver BC on May 6th, 1972. Evel jumped 13 cars in Toronto (CNE Stadium) on July 4th, 1972.He jumped 12 cars at the CNE in Toronto on August 3rd, 1973 and then jumped 13 cars at the CNE on August 23rd. On June 29th, 1974, Evel jumped 12 cars at the Edmonton Gardens. Finally, on August 20th, 1974, Evel successfully jumped 129 feet over 13 Mack Trucks in front of 21,000 fans in his final Canadian appearance.
