= Doug Danger =

American motorcycle racer

Doug "Danger" Senecal
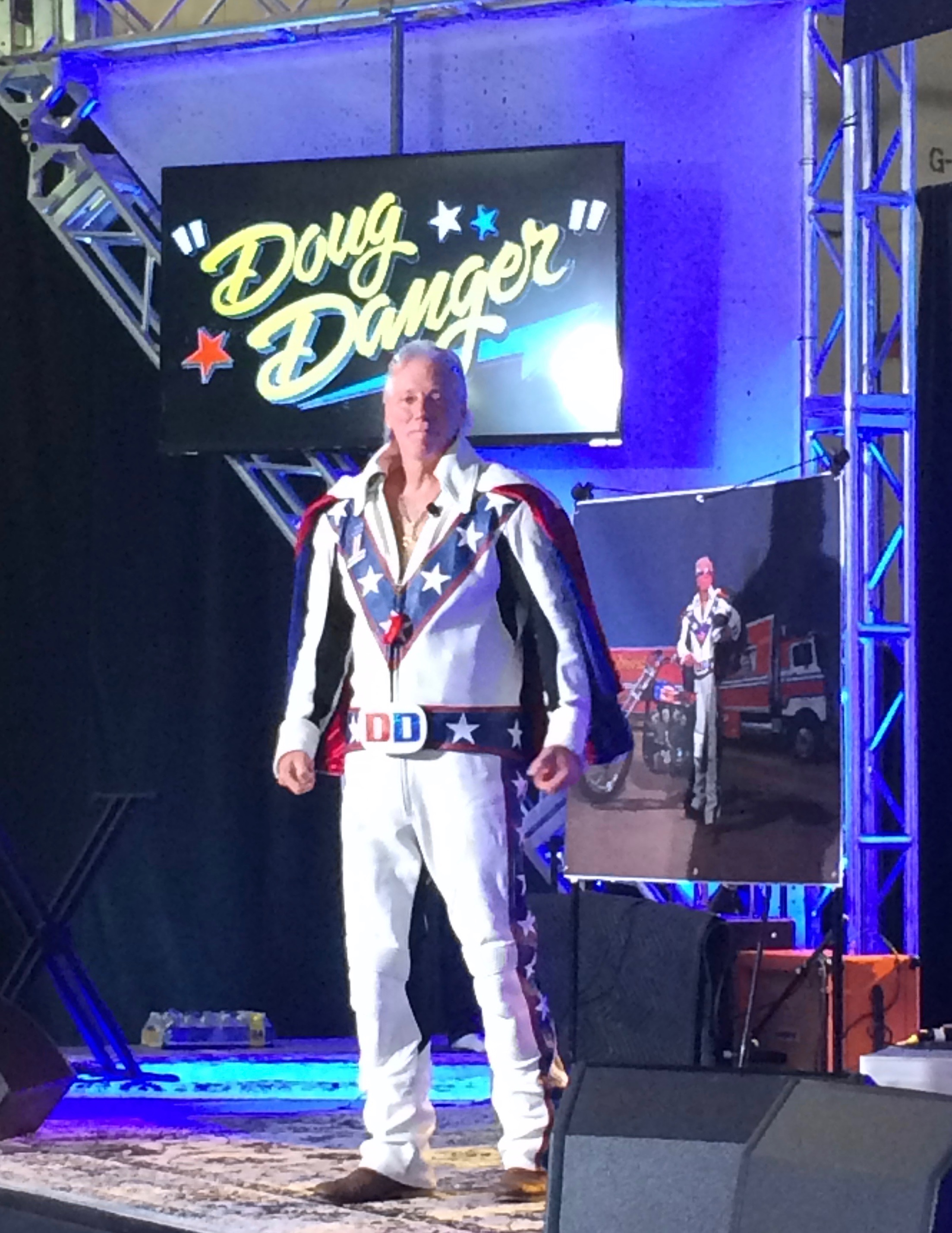
- Born: Doug Senecal; March 31, 1962 (age 64); Palmer, Massachusetts, US
- Occupations: Motorcycle jumper, Stunt performer, Motivational speaker
- Spouse: Maria Senecal
- Website: http://doug-danger.com

Doug "Danger" Senecal (born March 31, 1962) is known as Doug Danger. He is an American motorcycle jumping world record holder and stunt performer and Stage 4 cancer survivor who lives in Oak Hill, Florida.

Danger has set many records, including the Longest Motorcycle Jump, which was 251 feet over 42 cars. With that jump, he entered the Guinness Book of World Records in 1991. Danger also broke Evel Knievel's jump record over cars at The Legendary Buffalo Chip, Sturgis 75th Motorcycle Rally, Sturgis, South Dakota in 2015.

On his motorcycle, Danger has jumped a jumbo jet from wingtip to wingtip, over school buses, tractor-trailers, cars, as well as through fire. He's also crashed, accumulating a total of 50 broken bones, a fractured skull, burns, and once suffered amnesia that lasted a year.

Danger is sponsored by Vanson Leathers, Bell Helmets, and Mustang Seats.

Although Danger still jumps, he is now a motivational speaker at elementary schools, high schools, community-service organizations and corporations.

== Early life and history ==
Growing up in Palmer, Massachusetts, Danger's mother rode a motorcycle, but discouraged him from doing the same. However, as a young man, Danger saw Evel Knievel jump over 13 Mack trucks on ABC's Wide World of Sports in 1974. Danger aimed to follow in Knievel's footsteps by jumping his bicycle over his neighborhood friends when he was 11, and shortly after received his first motorcycle from his stepfather.

As a sophomore at Palmer High School, Danger drove his motorcycle through the school hallways on a dare. Palmer High asked him not to come back for his junior year, so he transferred and finished at Pathfinder in 1980.

When Danger was five and living with his parents in Las Vegas, Danger first saw Knievel jump live over the fountains at Caesar's Palace. Twelve years later, Danger made his first public motorcycle jump, over 10 cars, in Palmer. When his career took off, he and Knievel became friends.

== Career ==
=== 1979–90 ===
Danger began his motorcycle stunt career in 1979 when he jumped 10 cars in Palmer. At age 22, in 1984, he jumped over a three-story restaurant into Forest Lake in Massachusetts going 85 feet high and a distance of 145 feet. A year later, he made a 125cc motorcycle leap over 14 school buses in Thompson, Connecticut, earning him his first World Record. That same year, his motorcycle exploded during a fire stunt in North Carolina which threw him 150 feet down the track, legs in flames.

In 1990, Danger earned another American record, this one for 250cc bikes, by jumping 25 cars at a total of 181 feet at New Hampshire International Speedway.

=== 1991–2000 ===
In 1991, Danger set a World Record for a 251-foot motorcycle jump over 42 cars in Loudon, New Hampshire. That jump earned him a place in the Guinness Book of World records, and it stood for nine years as the Longest Motorcycle Jump. A year later, in a competition against Australian National Champion Jumper, Dar Davies, he won the International Motorcycle Jumping Competition at New Hampshire International Speedway. That same year, Danger signed a contract for a Daredevil Showdown with Robbie Knievel for a Pay-Per-View but the event never happened because in July 1992, a practice jump went awry and Danger crashed into a three-foot retaining wall at Hudson Speedway in New Hampshire breaking 17 bones and remaining in a coma for over a month. When he recovered, his memory was gone.

After recovering, Danger created the Doug Danger Motorcycle Stunt Spectacular, Legends Stunt Show, a thrill show that included various motorcycle jumps, firewall crashs, wheelie show, and automobile stunts. He partnered in the venture which ran from 1997 through 2003, with legendary stuntman Tim Chitwood.

One of the first jumps Danger made after his accident was on October 10, 1999: he jumped over 18 tractor-trailers at Sam Boyd Stadium in Las Vegas, Nevada, setting another World Record and breaking the one previously held by Robbie Knievel of 17 semi-trucks. On March 18, 2000, Danger jumped an L-1011 Jumbo Jet wing tip-to-wing tip, a stunt that was filmed for the "I Dare You" television show. For this, he rose 30 feet and traveled 160 feet across the airplane.

=== 2001–10 ===
Danger did a couple of stunts in May 2001 at Thompson Speedway, Connecticut, one involving a Honda CR500 motorcycle jumping 120 feet across three school buses lined up ended to end, and the other using a 1987 Harley Davidson 883 Sportster weighing over 500 pounds to jump over 10 cars.

Louis "Rocket" Re and Danger performed a double jump—two riders one behind the other in the air at the same time—covering over 100 feet on July 15, 2006, in New Castle, Pennsylvania. The duo met again later in July at Brockton Fair Grounds in Massachusetts for a head-on criss-cross jump where they passed each other at 70 mph with four feet of clearance that was filmed for a Country Music Television pilot called "Hell Drivers".

=== 2011-present ===
For two months, beginning May 2011, Danger made an Australian tour in Hell Raiser's of Insanity Extreme Stunt Show. Among the jumps were two that he made with a broken leg, obtained after a moving truck stunt. During the hospital examination in Australia, doctors discovered a lump near his tonsils, and after its removal was told it was benign cancer. Six months later, a cancerous growth surfaced, and he had another operation in the United States. The prognosis was not good. During his treatments, Danger injured himself again doing a jump in May 2012 to benefit The Children's Hospital of Philadelphia, Pennsylvania at Lulu Shriner's Arena in Plymouth, Pennsylvania. He separated his shoulder and broke his knuckle. After 35 radiation treatments, and three rounds of an experimental chemotherapy, each lasting five days, Danger received news that he was cancer free.

In 2012, Risky Rick Cruz, of the Ricksonian Daredevil Museum presented Danger with the honorary Triple Crown, awarded for the stunt performer's holding the 125cc, 250cc and 500cc motorcycle records at the same time.

Danger began a motivational speaking career in 2012 that continues. Entitled "Live Life Full Throttle", the message he brings to various elementary and high schools, community service organizations like the Boys and Girls Clubs, Chambers of Commerce, Rotary Clubs, Lions Clubs, and Motorcycle Shows is to follow your dreams, go for your goals, and maintain a drug-free life.

On June 14, 2014, Danger once again attached to the Evel Knievel legacy, by using Knievel's XR-750 Harley-Davidson to leap over 15 cars, 110 feet in across at the Republic of Texas Rally in Austin, Texas Danger was able to break Knievel's record the following year using Knievel's own XR-750 Harley-Davidson—loaned to Danger by its owner Lathan McKay—to jump 22 cars at the Buffalo Chip Campground during the 75th Sturgis motorcycle rally on August 6. The jump was 151 feet long, and was a success, outpacing the Knievel attempt, which only cleared 21 cars.

On April 7, 2016, Danger was recognized by Massachusetts State Senator Anne M. Gobi (D-Spencer), during a formal Senate Session.

Danger participates in the KSR Motorsports Monster Truck and Thrill Show, performing 25–30 shows a year, jumping, doing wheelies, and fire wall crashes.
