= Shelly Saltman =

American sports executive

Sheldon Arthur "Shelly" Saltman (August 17, 1931, in Boston – February 16, 2019, in Los Angeles) was a promoter of major sports and entertainment events including the worldwide promotion of the Muhammad Ali / Joe Frazier heavyweight championship boxing matches, creating the Andy Williams San Diego Golf Classic and helped to arrange the independent NFL Players Association games during the 1982 NFL season strike. Evel Knievel assaulted him with a baseball bat in 1977.

Saltman created, wrote, and produced shows for television such as Pro-Fan, Challenge of the NFL Cheerleaders (an early "reality" show), and the film Ring of Passion about the fights between American boxer Joe Louis and German champion Max Schmeling in the years leading up to World War II. He was also the author of various books including Evel Knievel on Tour, with Maury Green, and FEAR NO EVEL: An Insider's Look At Hollywood with Thomas Lyons.

== Early years ==
Shelly Saltman grew up during the Great Depression years as the child of Russian and Ukrainian Orthodox Jewish parents in Cambridge, Massachusetts.

== Sports ==
Saltman's father and an uncle, Louie, both played football for the Boston Braves (today, the Washington Commanders); another uncle, Eddie, pitched for the Boston Braves baseball team; and his uncle Miltie played for the Philadelphia Athletics (today, the Oakland Athletics). Saltman spent much of his childhood playing sports, attending Boston Red Sox and Boston Braves baseball games, and attempted to play professional basketball.

Saltman became a professional sportscaster and play-by-play announcer under the name of "Art Sheldon" with a career that included stints as a basketball coach, a baseball umpire, and a boxing ring announcer. He was among the founders of several professional and amateur sports organizations including the Phoenix Suns and the New Orleans Jazz basketball teams, and he was the first President of Fox Sports.

Saltman handled the worldwide promotion of the Muhammad Ali-Joe Frazier boxing championships, was co-creator of the 1970s "Challenge of the Sexes" TV shows, a key promoter and business partner in the failed Snake River Canyon rocket-cycle jump by motorcycle daredevil Evel Knievel, and for a time managed the careers of such sports stars as Canadian NHL hockey player Wayne Gretzky and American boxing champion Thomas Hearns.

== Entertainment ==
After serving in Japan as a sports announcer and radio broadcaster for the Far East Network of the U.S. Army during the Korean War, Saltman came home to the U.S. and began a television career in NBC working for the Gillette Cavalcade of Sports. He went on work as an executive for WBZ-TV in Boston and WJW-TV in Cleveland, making his mark as a promoter by doing such things as holding a press conference in a submarine underneath Boston Harbor for the TV show The Silent Service.

From Cleveland he moved on to a position as a Vice President for MCA in New York, working for what was then the largest and most influential talent agency in America. Saltman left MCA and New York after several years, accepting an offer from the Los Angeles talent agency of Bernard, Williams, and Price to focus his talents on promoting the international career of singing and recording star Andy Williams. While in Los Angeles, he worked as a public relations consultant, promoter, and/or manager for numerous performers including actor Jack Albertson, Wilt Chamberlain, and Roger Miller, and worked as the first national publicist for The Osmonds.

== Evel Knievel attack ==
In the mid-1970s, Saltman was one of the principals in a company called Invest West Sports. His company was contacted by boxing and sports promoter Bob Arum to invest the money necessary to fund and promote the Snake River Canyon rocket-cycle jump by motorcycle stuntman Evel Knievel. Invest West agreed with the condition that Saltman would head up the media promotion.

Saltman carried a tape recorder with him to capture elements of the promotion for an upcoming book. Knievel, Arum, and many others involved in the promotion were featured daily on the recordings, all of which they had previously approved.

In 1977, Dell Publishing released Saltman's book, Evel Knievel on Tour, which included information that an outraged Knievel claimed misled the public and damaged his reputation.

A few weeks after publication, Knievel went onto the lot of 20th Century Fox Studios, where Saltman was by then serving as president of Fox Sports. One of Knievel's friends grabbed Saltman and held him, while Knievel attacked him with an aluminum baseball bat, declaring, "I'm going to kill you!" According to a witness, Knievel struck repeatedly at Saltman's head, while Saltman attempted to block the attack with his left arm. Saltman's arm and wrist were shattered in several places before he fell to the ground unconscious.

When the news of Knievel's assault on Saltman was broadcast on national television, Saltman's elderly mother had a heart attack. She died three months later. Knievel received a sentence of six months in work furlough for his assault on Saltman. In the civil lawsuit that followed, the judge called Knievel's acts "cowardly" and awarded Saltman $12.75 million in damages. Knievel declared bankruptcy and none of the civil award was paid.

In 2007, Saltman released a second book, Fear No Evel: An Insider's Look at Hollywood, in which he told his side of the Knievel attack and chronicled his involvement in American sports and media.

After Knievel's death in late 2007, Saltman announced he would be suing the estate for the unpaid award from the civil suit, which he said amounted to over $100 million with interest. The award would remain uncollected.

== Family ==
Saltman was married for almost 51 years to Mollie Heifetz, who died on July 1, 2007, after suffering from cancer and kidney disease. The couple were survived by their two children—along with four grandchildren.

== Death ==
Saltman was living with his longtime partner Sue Nober when he died on February 16, 2019, at the age of 87.
